= 1746 in architecture =

The year 1746 in architecture involved some significant events.

== Buildings and structures ==
=== Buildings ===
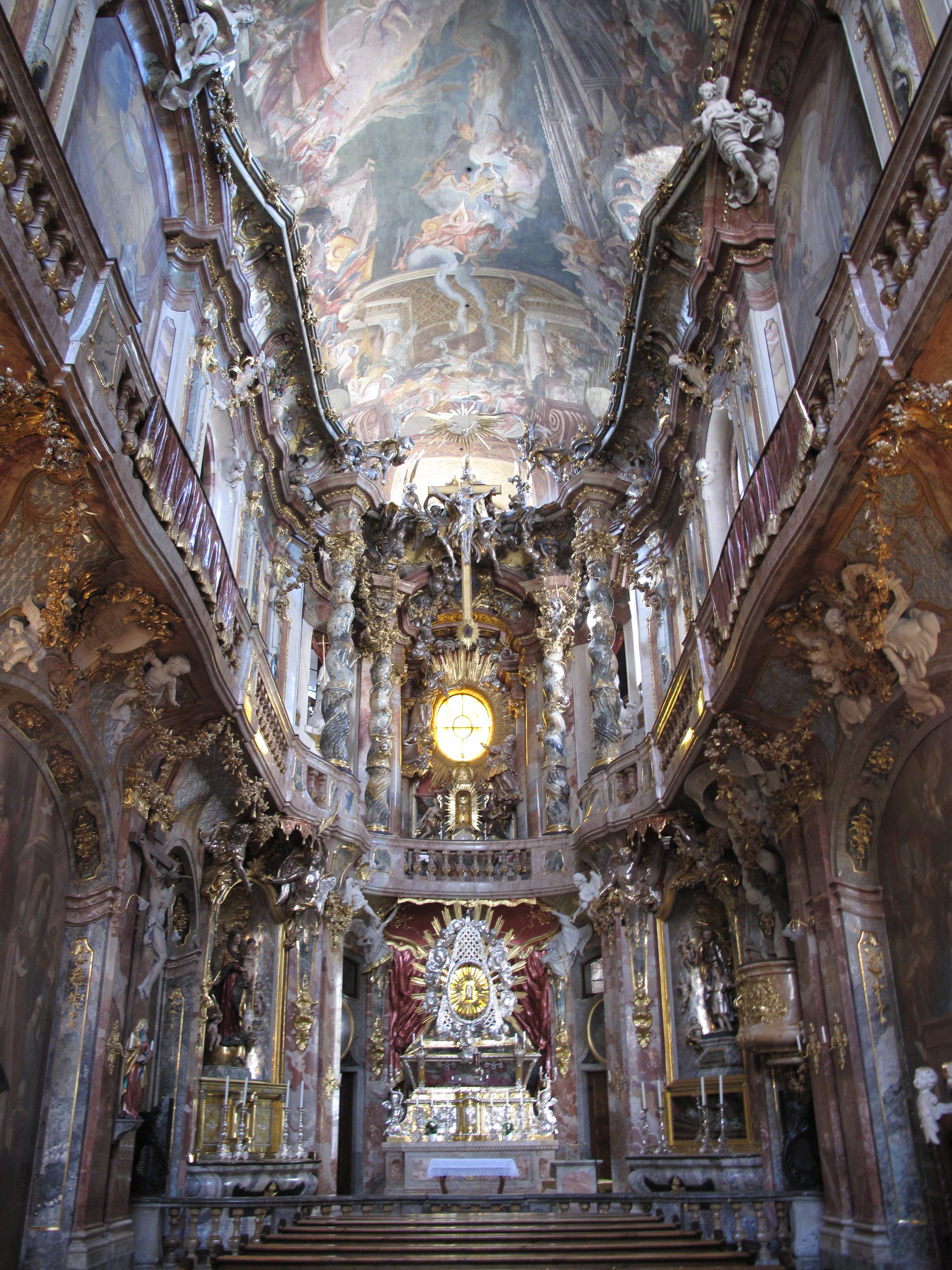
Asamkirche, Munich

- Mansion of Ledreborg on Zealand, designed by Johan Cornelius Krieger, completed.
- Asamkirche, Munich, designed by Egid Quirin Asam and Cosmas Damian Asam, completed.
- Old Trinity Cathedral, Saint Petersburg, Russia, completed.
- St Lawrence's Church, Mereworth, England, consecrated.
- Transfiguration Church, Szentendre, Hungary, completed.
- Rebuilding of main chapel of the Cathedral of Évora, Portugal, designed by João Frederico Ludovice, completed.
- Second phase of construction of Poppelsdorf Palace near Bonn completed.
- Foundation stone of new Inveraray Castle in Scotland laid.

== Births ==
- August 3 – James Wyatt, English architect (died 1813)

== Deaths ==
- May 15 – John James, English architect (born c. 1673)
- June 8 – Giacomo Leoni, Venetian-born architect (born 1686)
