= Fürstenfeld Abbey =

Monastery in Bavaria, Germany

Coordinates: 48°10′10″N 11°14′58″E

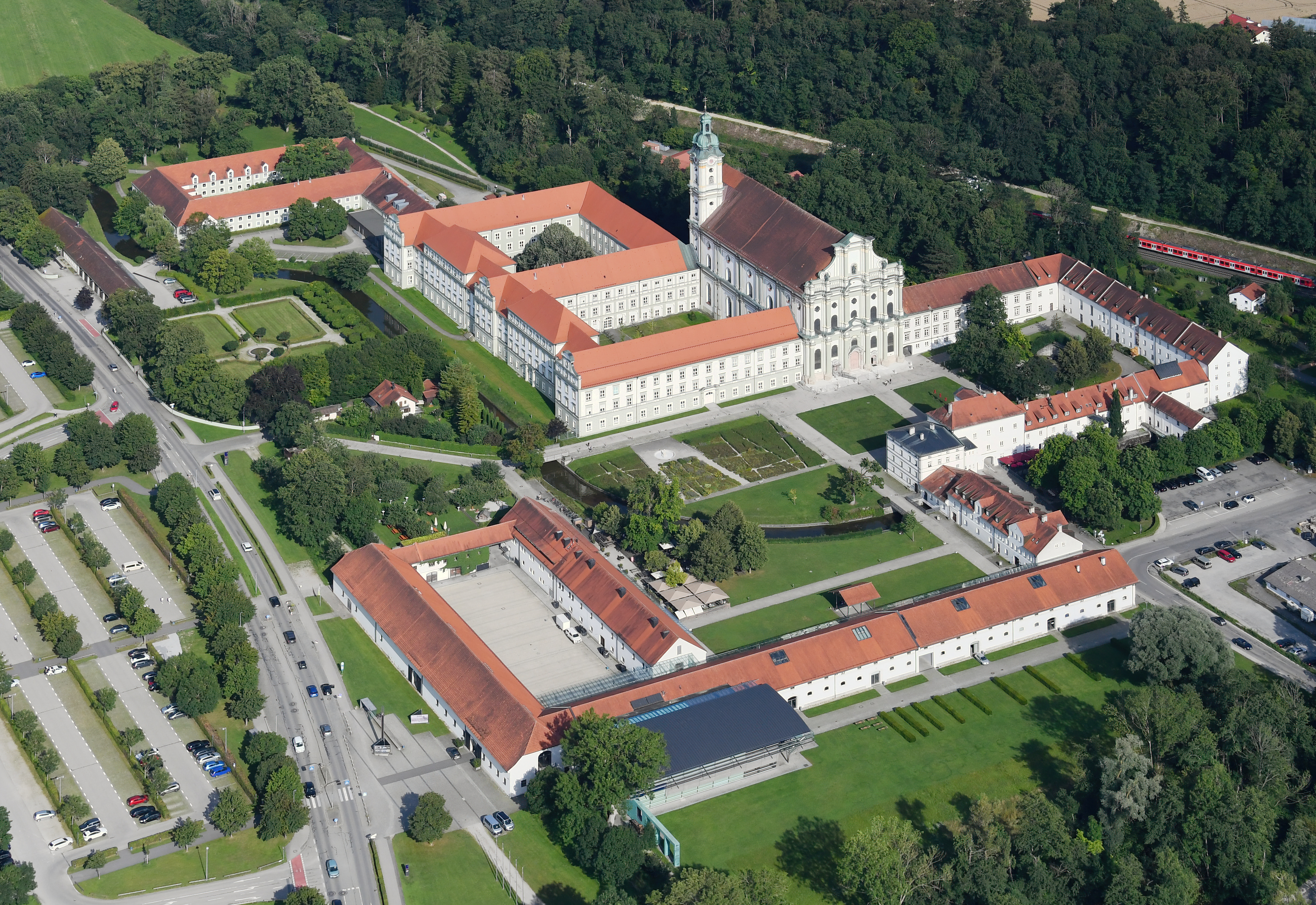
Aerial view of the Fürstenfeld Abbey

Fürstenfeld Abbey (German: Kloster Fürstenfeld, [fʏʁstn̩fɛlt]) is a former Cistercian monastery in Fürstenfeldbruck (formerly known simply as Bruck), Bavaria, Germany.

Located about 25 km northwest of Munich, the abbey was one of the household monasteries of the Wittelsbachs. Its church, dedicated to the Assumption of the Virgin Mary, is considered a masterpiece of the late Baroque in southern Germany.

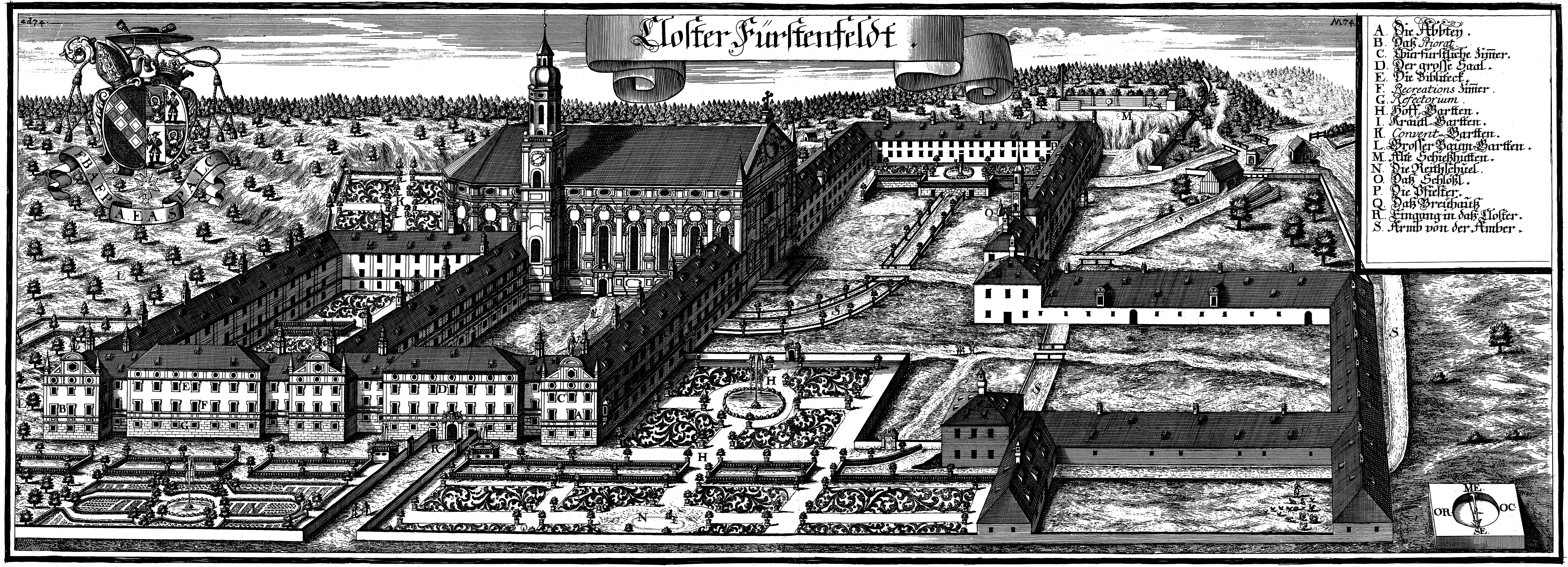
Fürstenfeld Abbey: engraving by Michael Wening in Topographia Bavariae, about 1700

== History ==
In 1256, Louis II, Duke of Bavaria (known as Louis the Severe) killed his first wife, Marie of Brabant (1226–1256) on unfounded suspicions of adultery. As penance, Pope Alexander IV required him to found a monastery. The initial foundation was established in 1258 at Seldental, near Aibling, but was later relocated to its present site near the town of Bruck in 1263. Papal permission for the new foundation to be settled by Cistercian monks from Aldersbach Abbey had been obtained as early as 1256, but was not confirmed by the Bishop of Freising until 1265, in which year the new abbey was at last settled. The monks actively promoted the cult of Leonard of Noblac, and his shrine at the nearby village of Inchenhofen became a major pilgrimage site.

Louis II endowed and privileged the new abbey very handsomely and when he died, was buried here. His son, Louis IV, Holy Roman Emperor, was also a great benefactor to the abbey, which supported him in his dynastic struggle against the Habsburger Frederick the Handsome. Emperor Louis IV died of a stroke at Puch nearby on 11 October 1347 during a bear hunt, and his heart was buried here. Both men named Louis are commemorated by elaborate Baroque monuments.

In the Thirty Years' War, in 1632/33 the monastery was sacked by the troops of King Gustavus Adolphus of Sweden, and the monks fled to Munich. From 1640 however the abbey began to make an economic recovery. Under Abbot Martin Dallmayr several churches were built and the number of monks doubled.

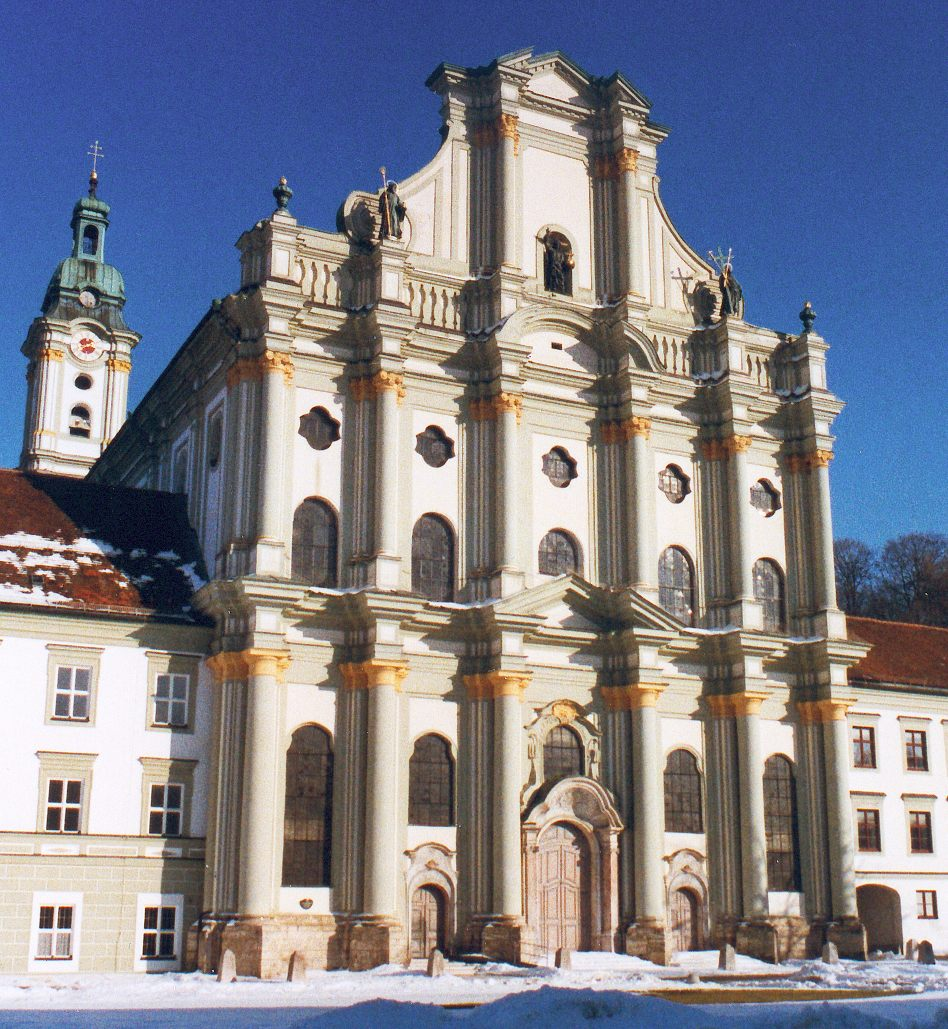
West front of the abbey church of the Assumption

In 1691 the foundation stone was laid of the Baroque monastery buildings, responsibility for the construction of which lay with the Munich court architect and master builder, Giovanni Antonio Viscardi.

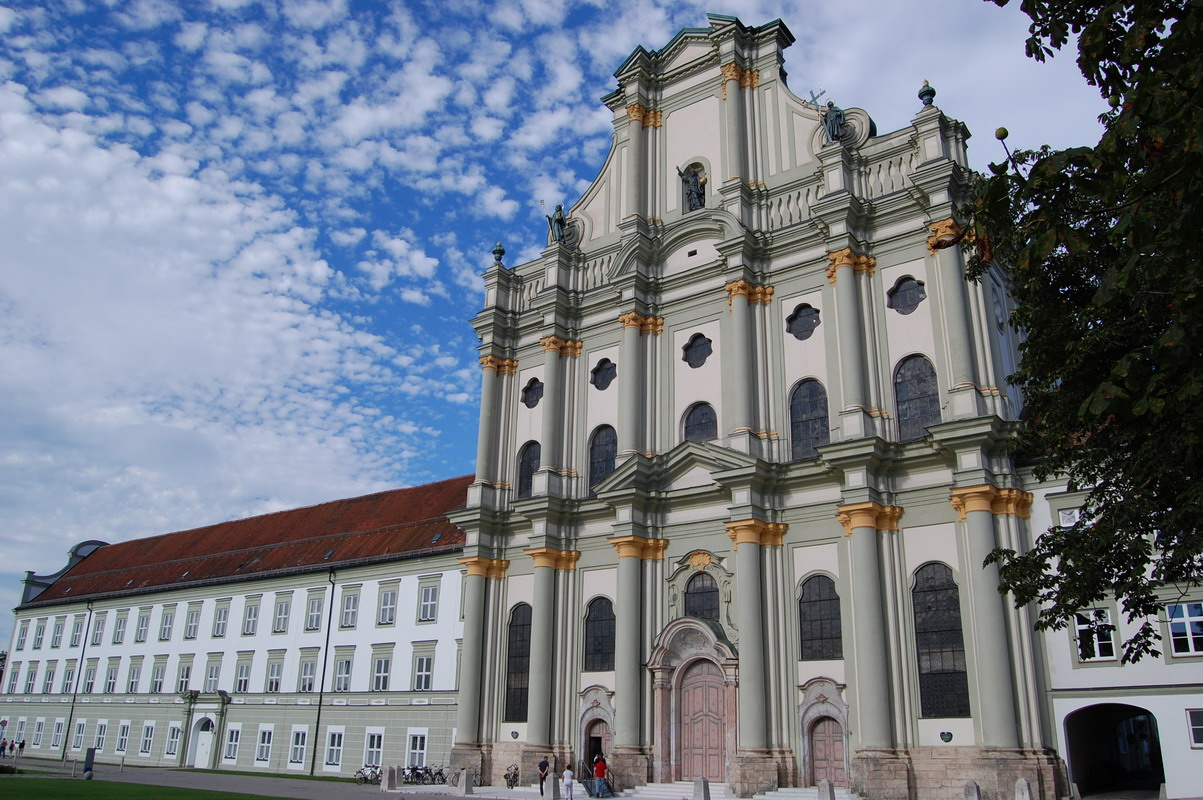
Another angle of the west front, showing more of the abbey

== Church of the Assumption of the Virgin Mary ==
Construction began after the War of the Spanish Succession, and completed about 1780.

Artists employed included the brothers Jacopo and Francesco Appiani and the Asam brothers: Cosmas Damian Asam painted the ceiling frescoes, and Egid Quirin Asam created the side altars and possibly also the design of the high altar.

The church contains remains said to be those of Saint Hyacinth of Caesarea and Saint Clemens.

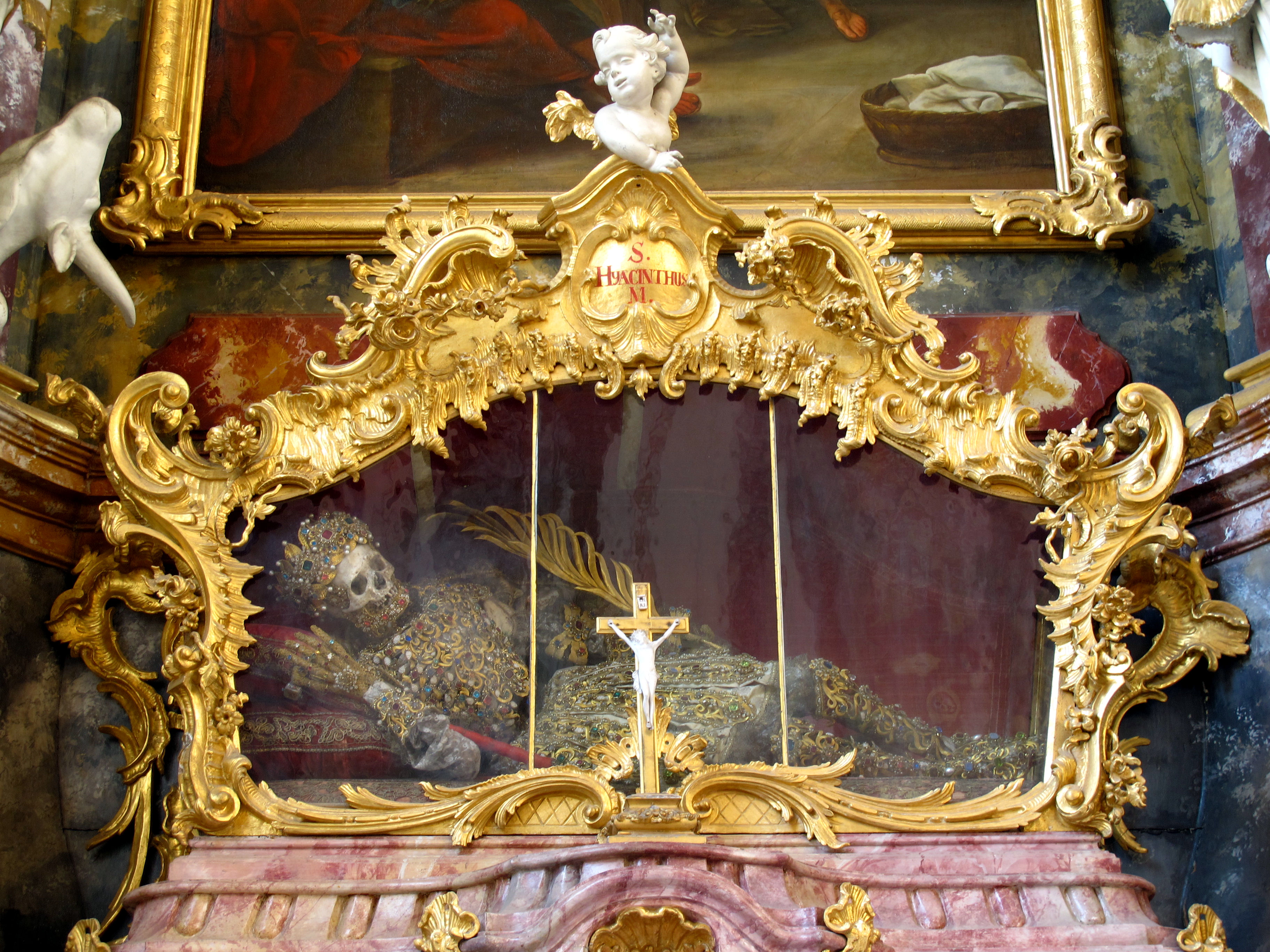
Jewelled full-body relic of Saint Hyacinth in the former Cistercian monastery Fürstenfeld Abbey

== Secularisation and after ==
In 1803, as a result of the general secularisation in Bavaria, Fürstenfeld Abbey passed into private ownership. The new proprietor was Ignaz Leitenberger, a Bohemian cloth manufacturer. In 1816 it became the property of King Maximilian I Joseph of Bavaria and served as a church of the royal family.

In 1817 the Bavarian Field Marshal Prince Wrede bought the monastery, in which a year later a hospital and home for invalid soldiers was opened. In 1866 part of the premises to the south of the church, in use at the time as a hospital, was destroyed in a fire.

After 1918 the former service range became the property of the Wittelsbach Compensation Fund, which rented it in 1923 to Ettal Abbey.

In 1979 the town of Fürstenfeldbruck acquired the service buildings, which they re-modelled between 1987 and 2001 into a new cultural centre for the citizens of the district of Fürstenfeldbruck.

== Burials ==
- Louis II, Duke of Bavaria

== Sources and external links ==
- Media related to Kloster Fürstenfeld at Wikimedia Commons
- (in German) Official website
- (in German) Fürstenfeld in the Abbeys of Bavaria database
- (in German) Webcam with pictures of Kloster Fürstenfeld
- (in German) Veranstaltungsforum Fürstenfeldbruck
- The Warburg Institute Iconographic Database (photos of the church interior)
