= Osterhofen Abbey =

Bavarian monastery

- Kloster Osterhofen
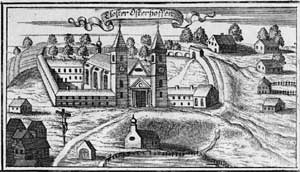
- Copper engraving of the abbey by Johann Ulrich Kraus from the "Churbaierische Atlas" of Anton Wilhelm Ertl, 1687

- Location within Bavaria Location within Germany
- Interactive map of Osterhofen Abbey

Monastery information
- Other name: Altenmarkt Abbey
- Order: Premonstratensian
- Established: 1128
- Disestablished: 1783
- Dedication: Saint Margaret
- Diocese: Passau

People
- Founder: Bishop Otto von Bamberg

Architecture
- Functional status: In use

Site
- Coordinates: 48°41′30″N 13°00′55″E

Osterhofen Abbey (German: Kloster Osterhofen, also called Altenmarkt Convent German: Altenmarkt-Damenstift) is a former monastery in Bavaria, Germany, It is located in the Altenmarkt section of Osterhofen, a town to the south of the Danube between Deggendorf and Vilshofen / Passau. It has its origins in a collegiate built in 1004–09. From 1128 to 1783 it was a Premonstratensian monastery. For a while it was then a convent. Today it contains a girls' secondary school. The former abbey church, a magnificent late baroque building erected in 1726–40, is now the Basilica of Saint Margaret.

== Monastery history ==
Henry V, Duke of Bavaria and his wife Luitgard erected a collegiate abbey of Augustinian Canons in his palace in Osterhofen in 1004–09. In 1017 the Emperor Henry II of Germany transferred the abbey to the diocese of Bamberg. In 1128 Bishop Otto of Bamberg brought men and women from the Premonstratensian Ursberg Abbey to the Osterhofen collegiate abbey. The abbey was endowed with extensive properties in the Wachau valley of Austria. The female branch of the abbey was probably extinct after 1200. In 1288 the head of the abbey become a provost. In 1414 the abbot was granted the right to wear the miter in liturgical celebrations.

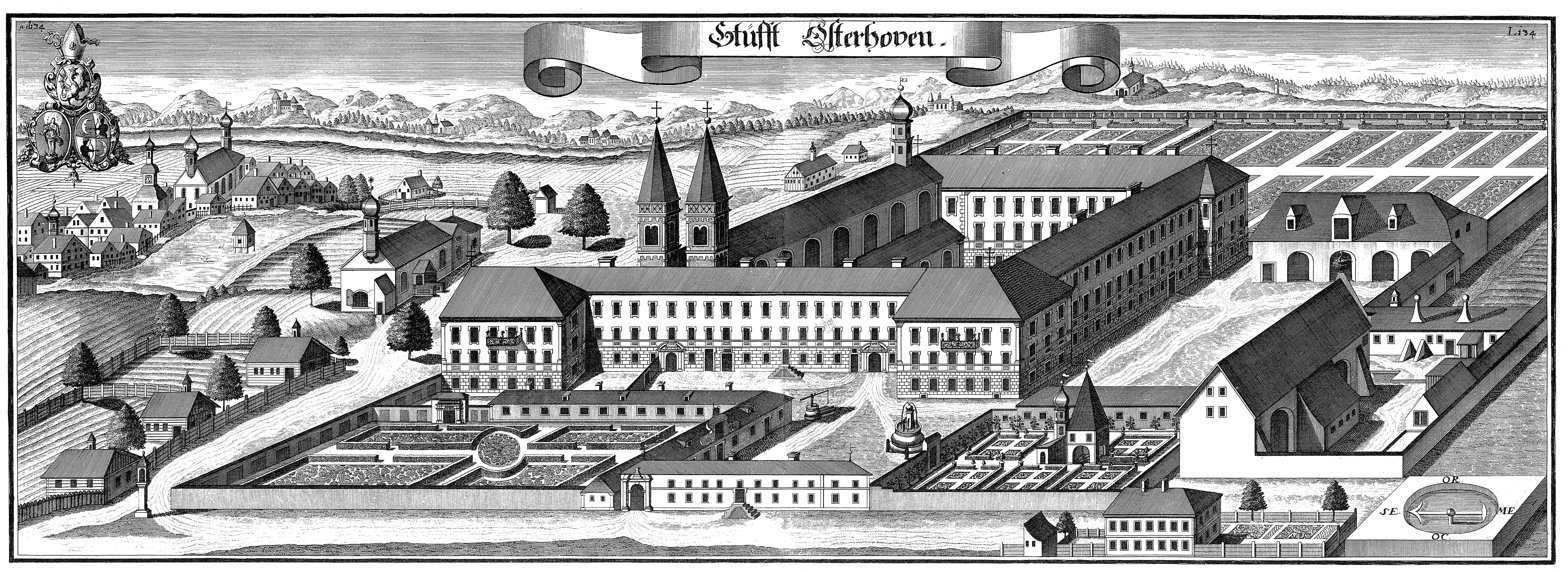
The abbey around 1700 by Michael Wening

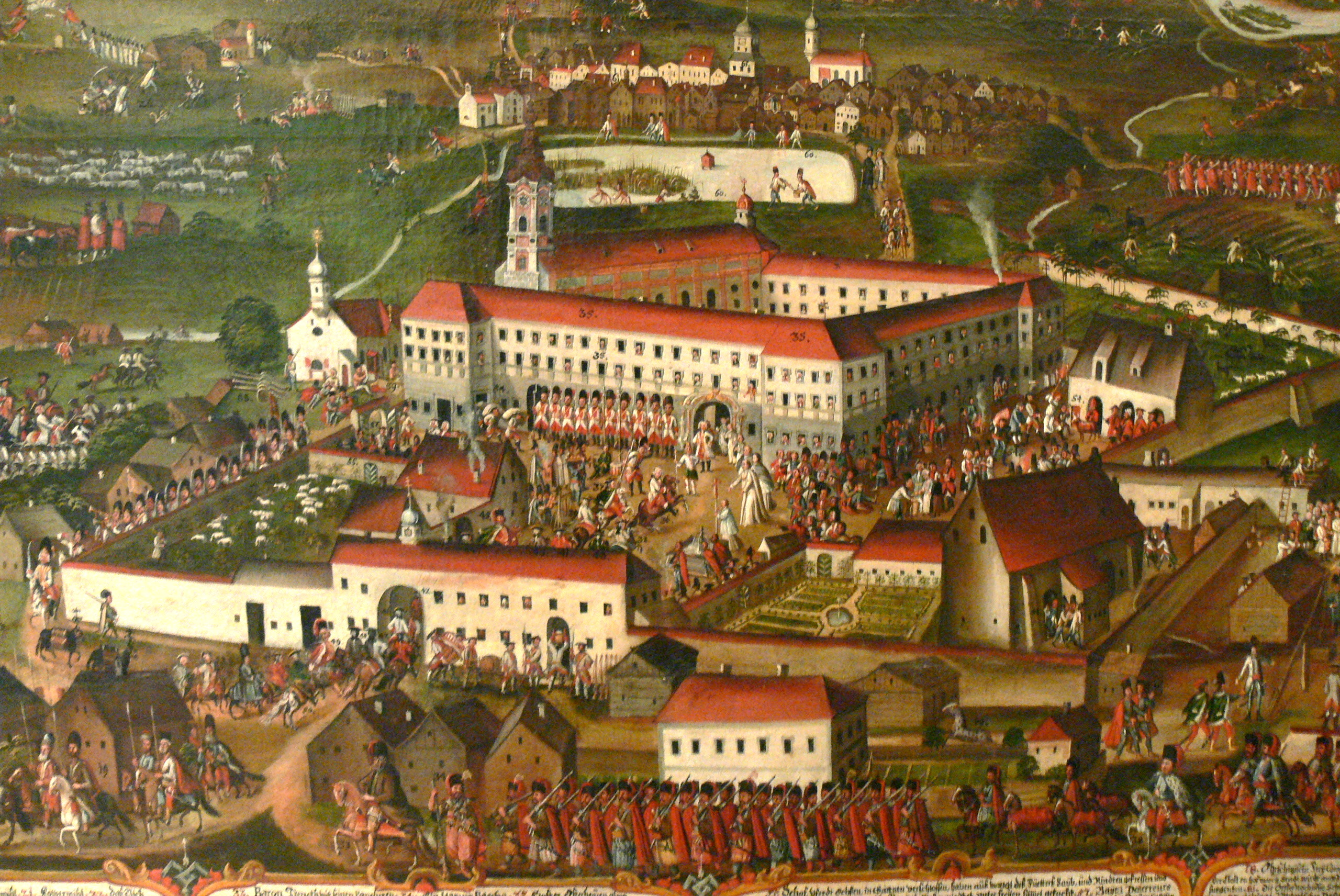
1748 J.G. Käser painting of fighting between Deggendorf and Vilshofen during the War of the Austrian Succession

Through its history, the monastery and the town had a checkered history, suffering damage from warfare and fire. There was a fire in the monastery in 1512. In 1701 a major fire caused by lightning destroyed the monastery. It was rebuilt in 1717–27. The former Gothic church also suffered great damage, and in 1726 it was decided to erect a new building. The fantastically ornamented monastery church was designed and built in 1726–40.

== List of abbots ==
- Richwinus (1138–1140)
- Truhemar (1140–1155)
- Engelschalk (1155–1180)
- Dietmar (1180–1181)
- Walther (1181–1195)
- Gerungus (1195–1227)
- Heinrich (1228–1237)
- Ulrich, Berthold
- Heinrich II. (1241–1254)
- Eberhard, Ulrich II., Hermann I.
- Albert I. (1256–1260)
- Konrad (c. 1267), Albert II. (c. 1284) and three others
- Ulrich IV. (1288–1324)
- Ulrich V. (1324–1335)
- Hermann II. (1335–1348)
- Petrus I. (1349–1359)
- Wilhelm (1362–1367)
- Ruger (1367–1390)
- Andreas I. (1390–1405)
- Johann I. (1405)
- Johann II. Vötter (1405–1422)
- Ernest (1422)
- Andreas II. Kamp (1422–1429)
- Martin Wirsinger (1429–1437)
- Peter II. (1437–1447)
- Johann III. (1447–1461)
- Johann IV. Schiltl (1461–1483)
- Georg I. Hölzl (1484–1500)
- Johann V. Retzinger (1500–1504)
- Vitalis von Seyboldsdorf (1504–1508)
- Stephan Wirsinger (1508–1544)
- Johann VI. Pock (1544–1547)
- Georg II. Schregl (1548–1555)
- Wolfgang Scharfnickl (1555–1557)
- Johann VII. Bitterle (Administrator 1558, Abbot 1560–1579)
- Johann VIII. Wolf (Administrator 1579, Abbot 1583–1593)
- Michael I. Vögele (1593–1604)
- Johann IX. Wöckhl (1604–1625)
- Georg III. Greiß (1625–1630)
- Christoph Dimpfle (1630–1672)
- Gottfried Molitor (1672–1675)
- Michael II. Steinmayer (1675–1701)
- Ferdinand Schöller (1701–1717)
- Joseph Mari (1717–1727)
- Paulus Wieniger (1727–1764)
- Michael III. (1765–1781)
- Bernhard (1781–1783)

== Later history ==
In 1783 the monastery was dissolved by the Bavarian state. Maria Anna Sophia, the widow of the Elector of Bavaria, wished to give the noble-born nuns of the convent of Saint Anne in Munich a better endowment. The Pope agreed to assign the monastery and its properties to the sisters. The last of the Premonstratensians remained in the building until 1800. The church became the parish church in 1818. The convent sold the monastery building to the state in 1833.

In 1858 the Sisters of Loreto moved into the building and founded a girls' secondary school. The school had six English lady teachers with twelve pupils. It was intended for girls "from better homes". In 1859 it was designated a school for middle-class girls to learn housework, and from 1859 to 1873 as an institute for neglected children. In 1886 it became a college of education. Care of small children began in 1901. The school started accepting day pupils in 1913. A dilapidated part of the abbey's west wing was demolished in 1938. In 1942 the school was temporarily closed, opening again in 1946 as a 3-class middle school for girls. It became a 4-level secondary school in 1961, and a 6-level secondary school in 1999. The Realschule Damenstift (Convent Secondary School) was transferred to the Mary Ward Foundation of the Diocese of Passau in 2001. It is a government recognized secondary school for girls.

== Church ==
The monastery church, built in colored stucco and marble, is one of the most lavishly decorated in Lower Bavaria. It was designed and built between 1726 and 1740 by the Munich architect and master-builder Johann Michael Fischer (1727–28) and the brothers Cosmas Damian Asam and Egid Quirin Asam. The nave is large, bright and spacious, with a 22 metres (72 ft) high ceiling. The Asam brothers created a throne room in honor of God, a "theatrum sacrum". Cosmas Damian Asam, a brilliant painter, created the wonderful frescoes in the church. His brother Egid Quirin Asam filled the church interior with sculptures and ornaments, notably the impressive high altar. The altarpiece represents Saint Margaret set within a pagan environment, with a statue of Venus in a temple behind her. The church is considered a masterpiece of late baroque Bavarian church architecture. In 1983 the church became the Minor Basilica of St. Margaret, known as the Asambasilika.

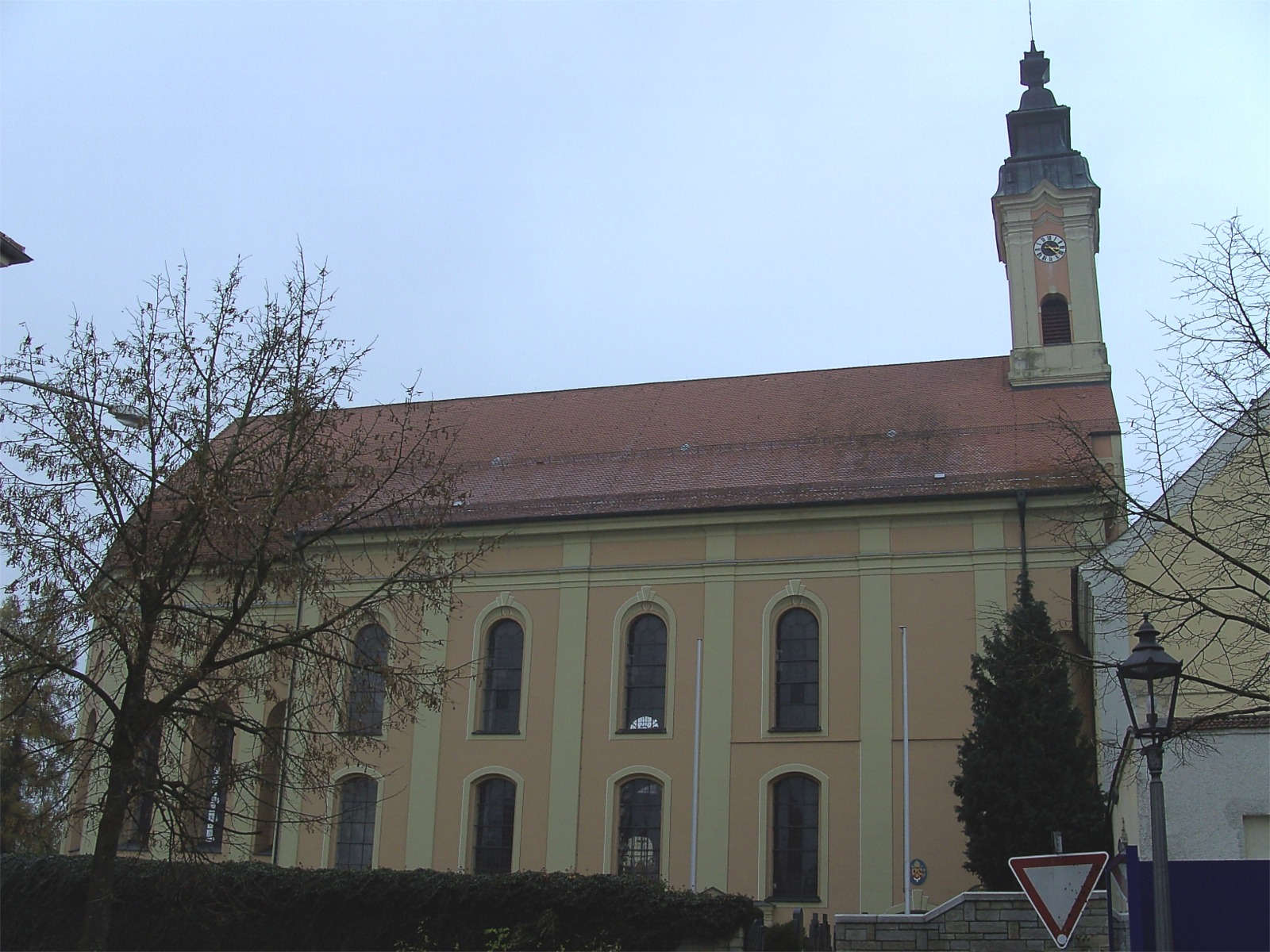
Asam Basilica in Altenmarkt

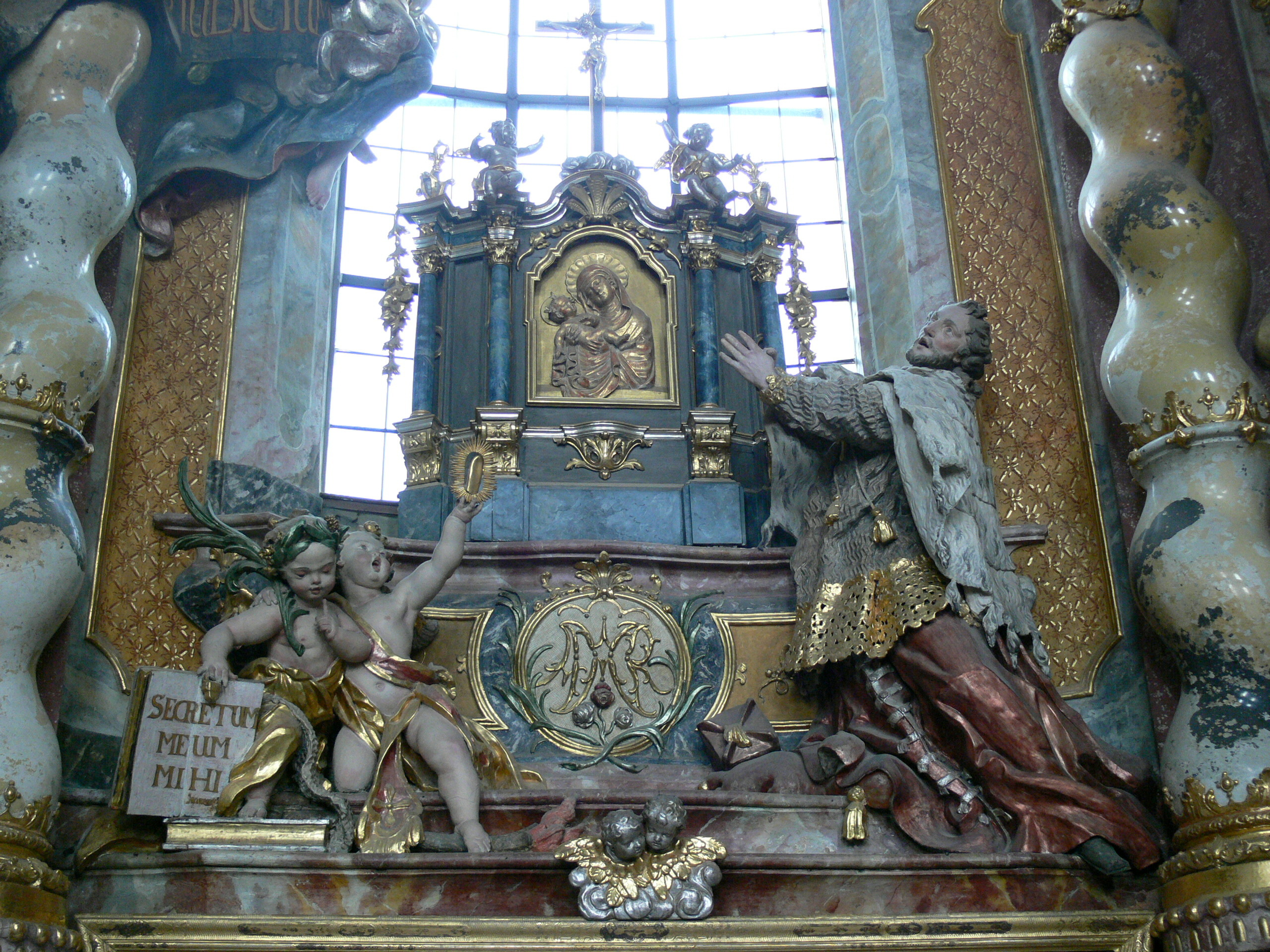
Asam Basilica altar of Saint John of Nepomuk

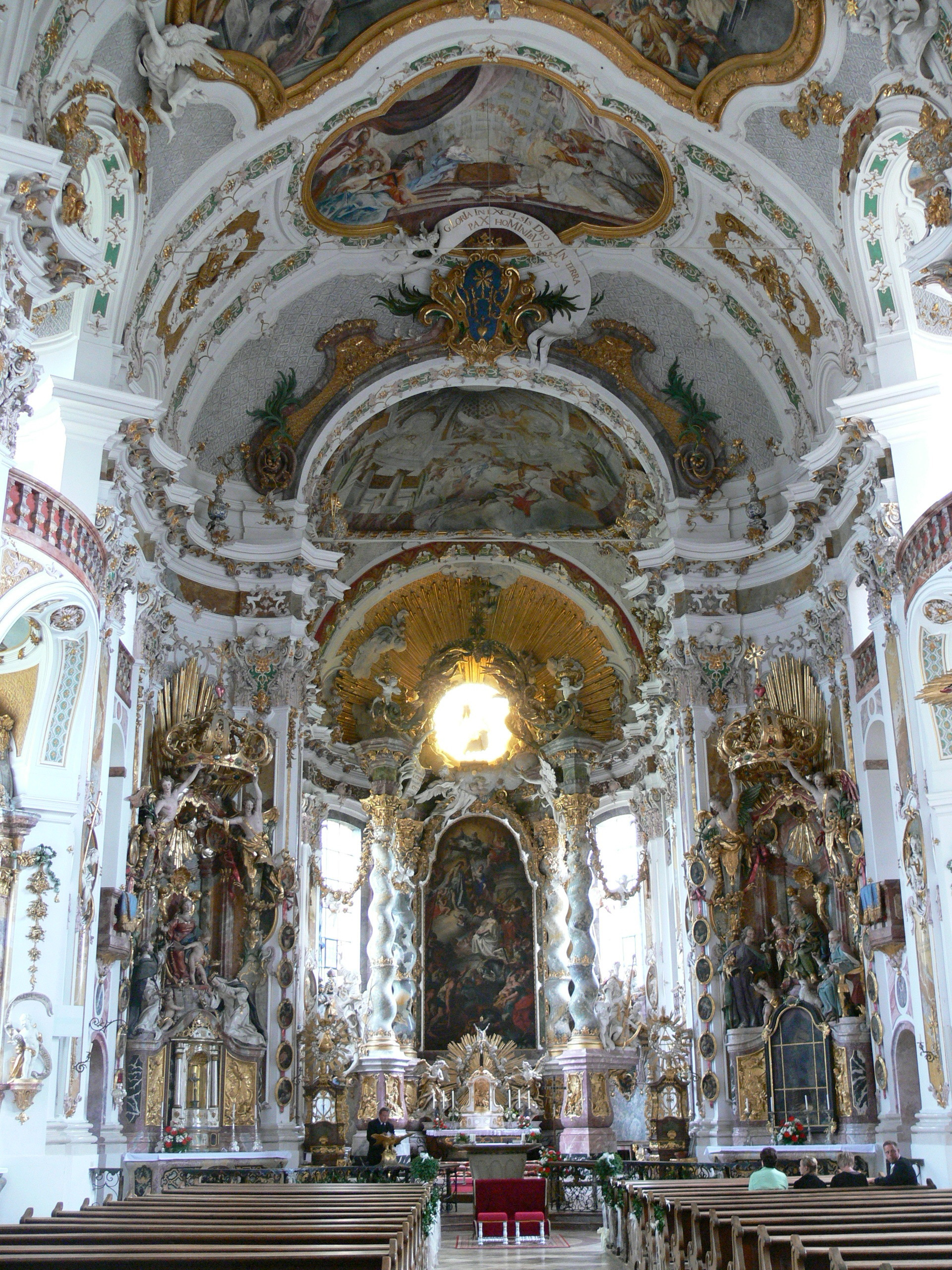
Nave

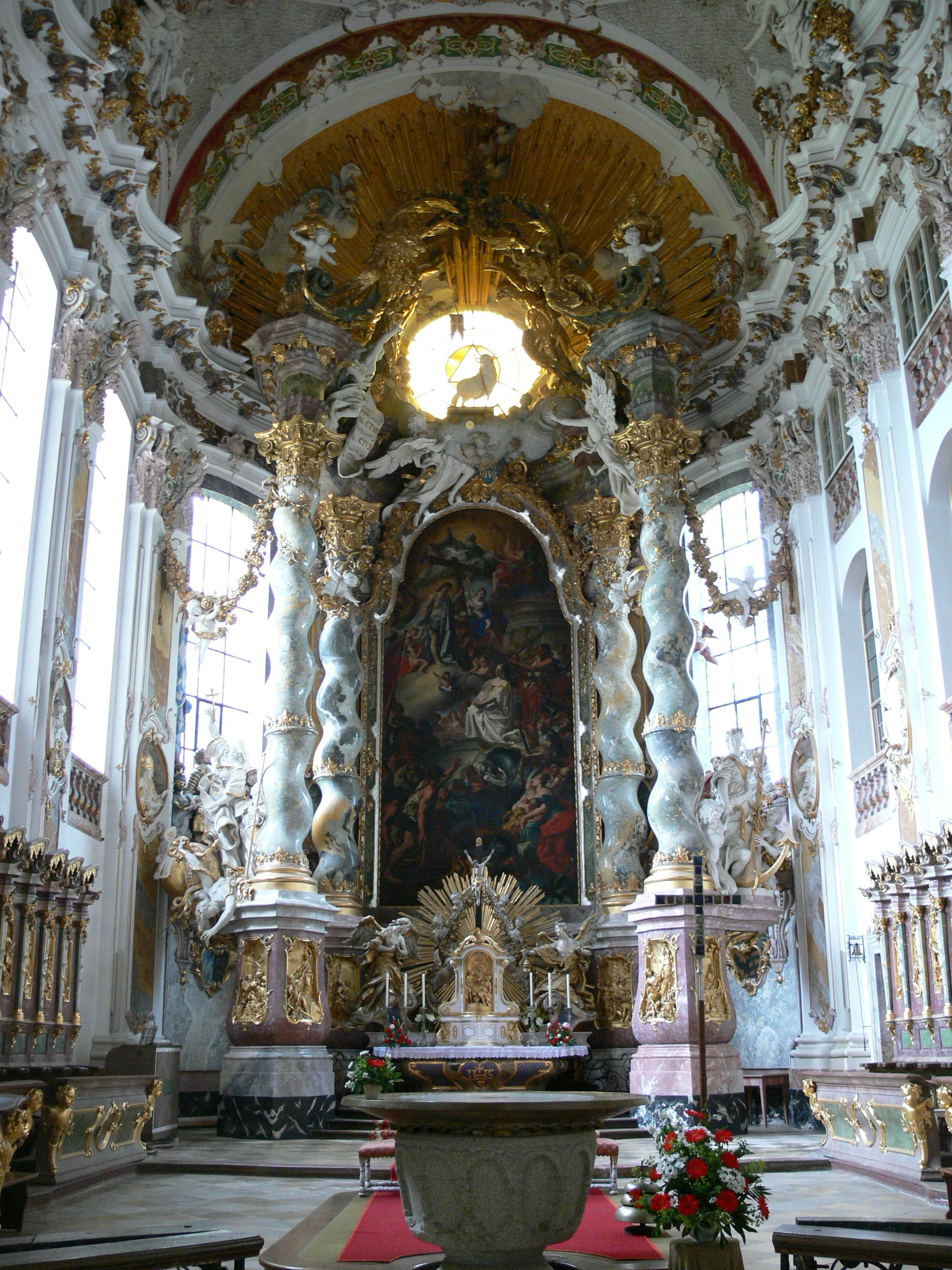
Theatrum sacrum and high altar

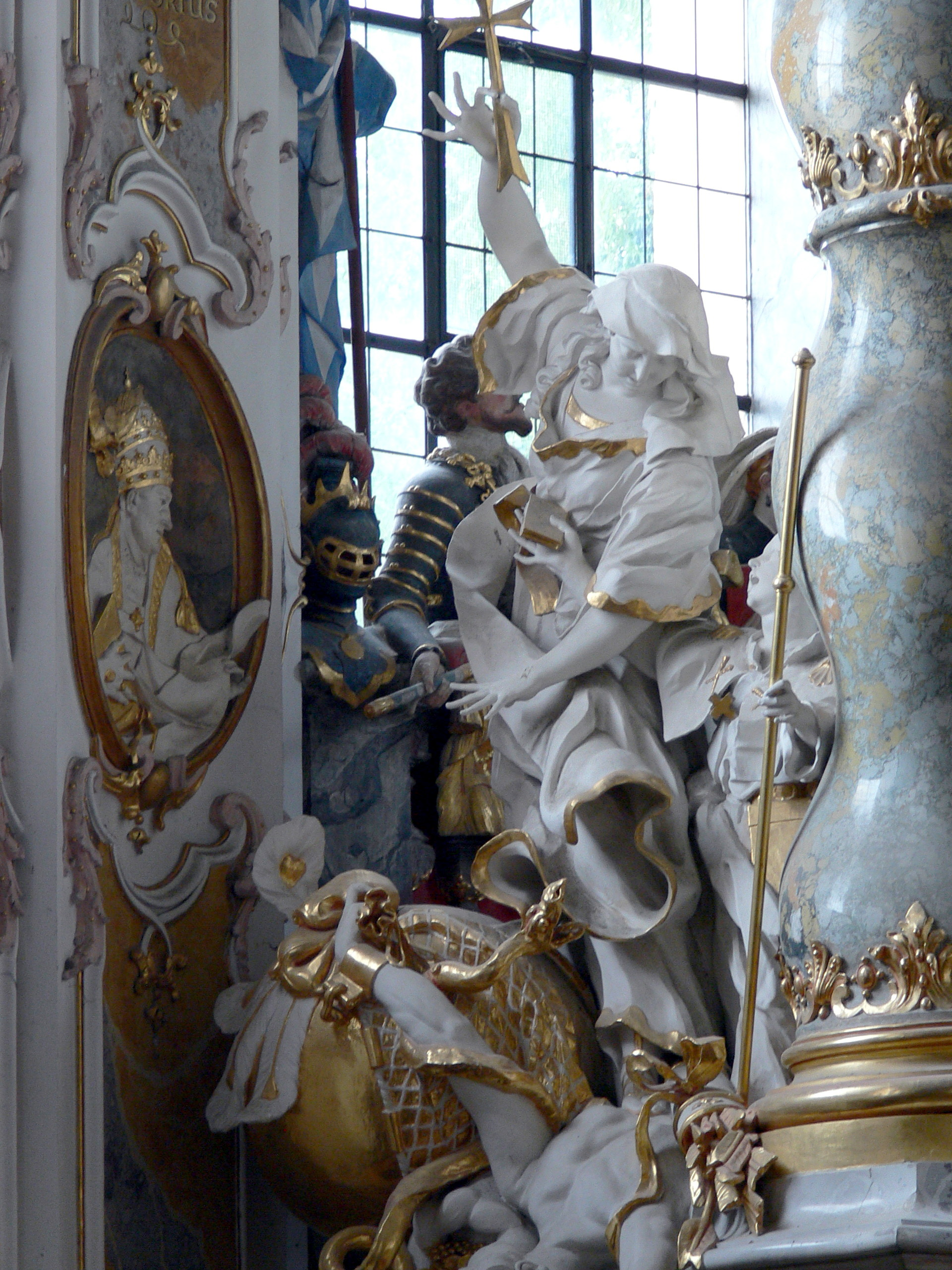
High altar - Faith fighting against infidelity and evil

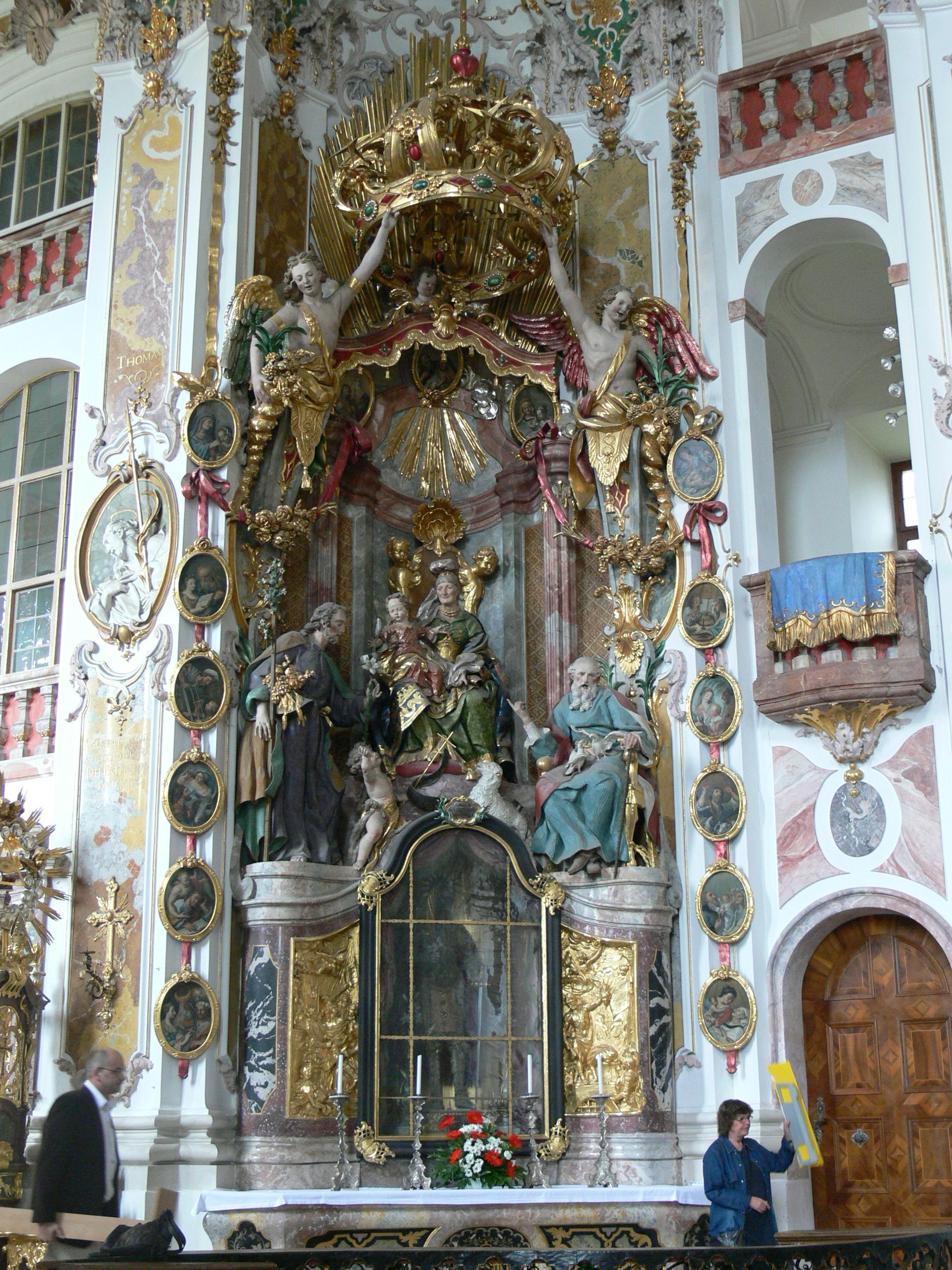
Altar of Saint Anne

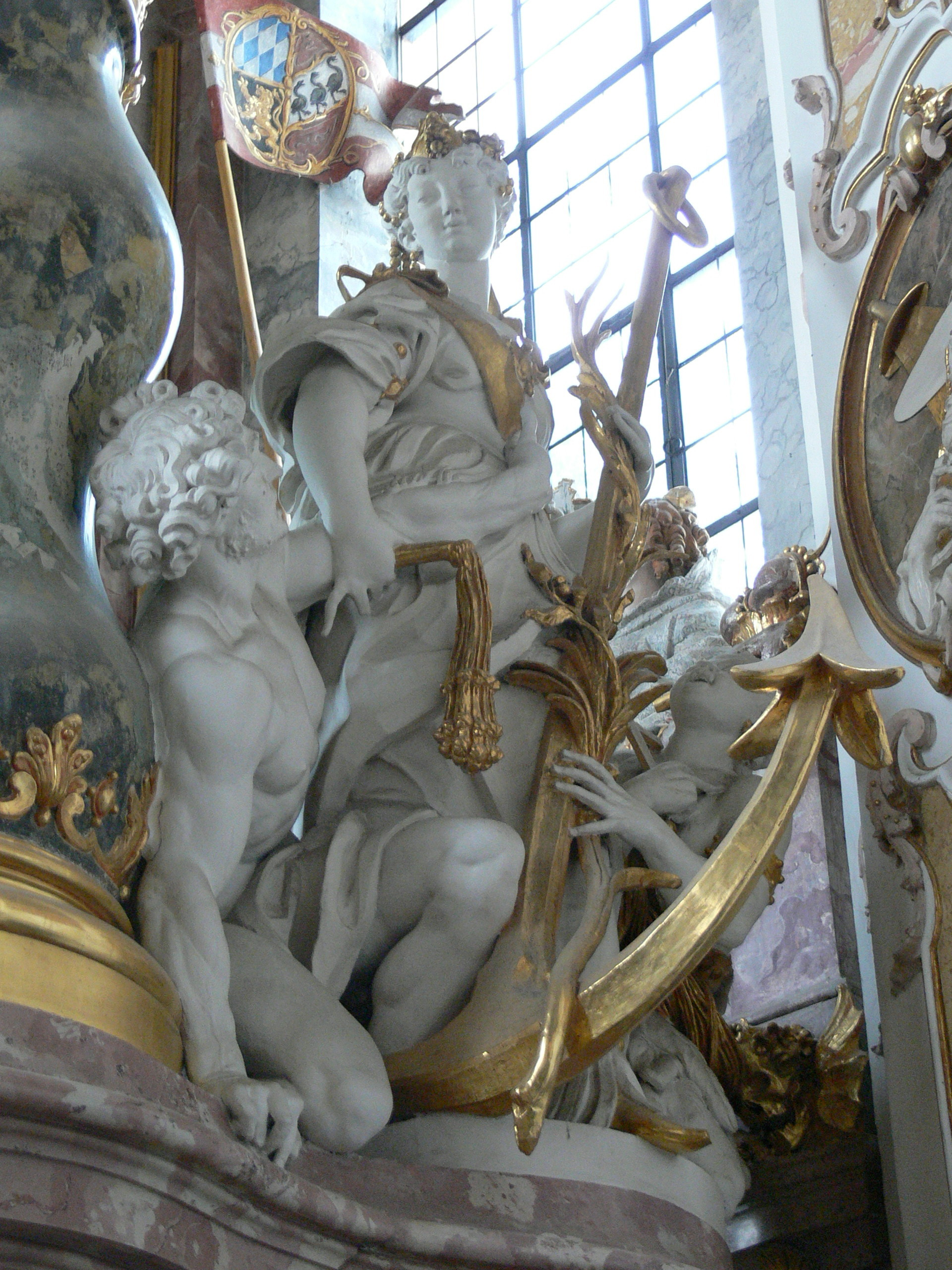
High Altar - Hope in support of mankind

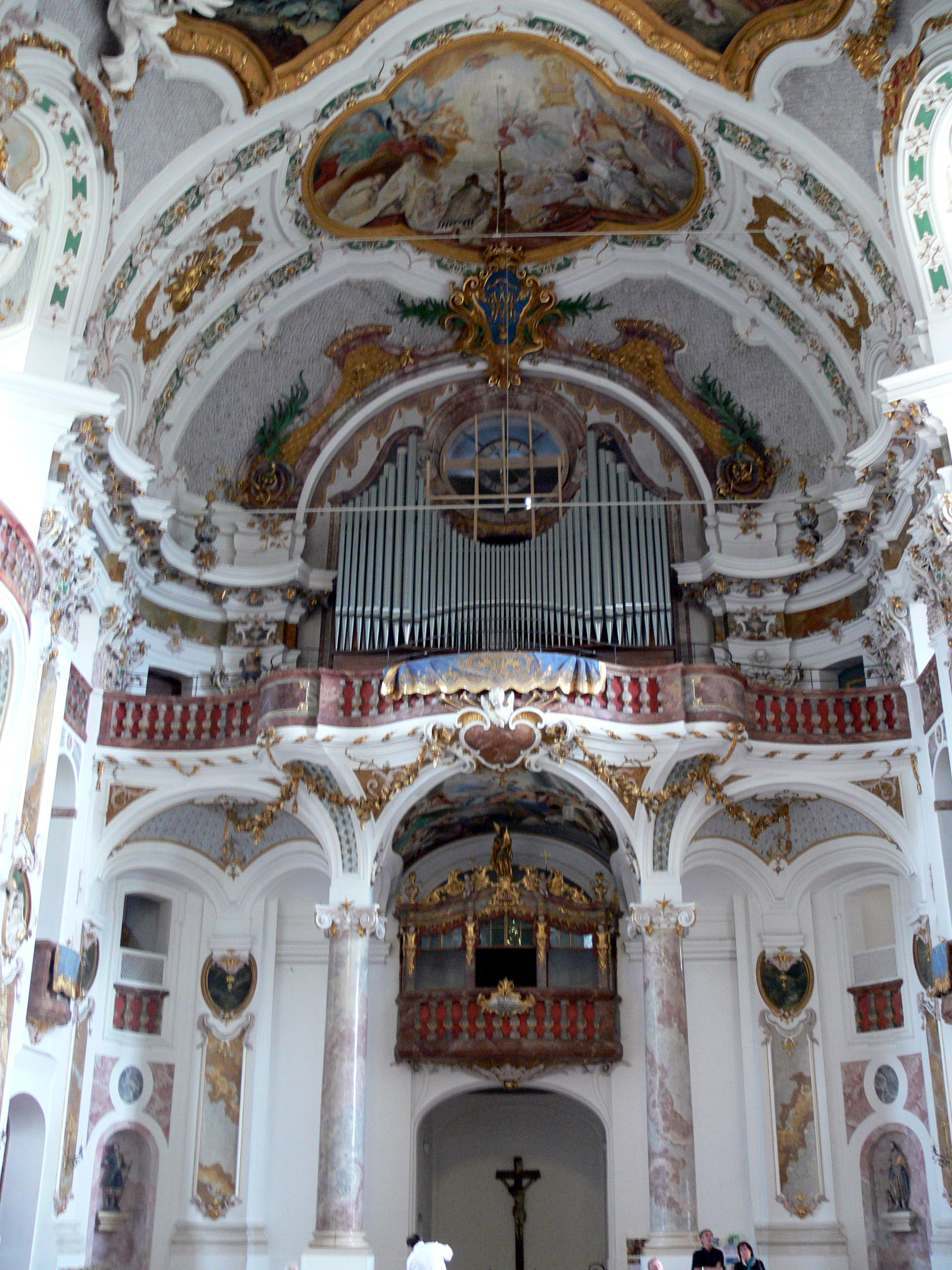
Organ loft

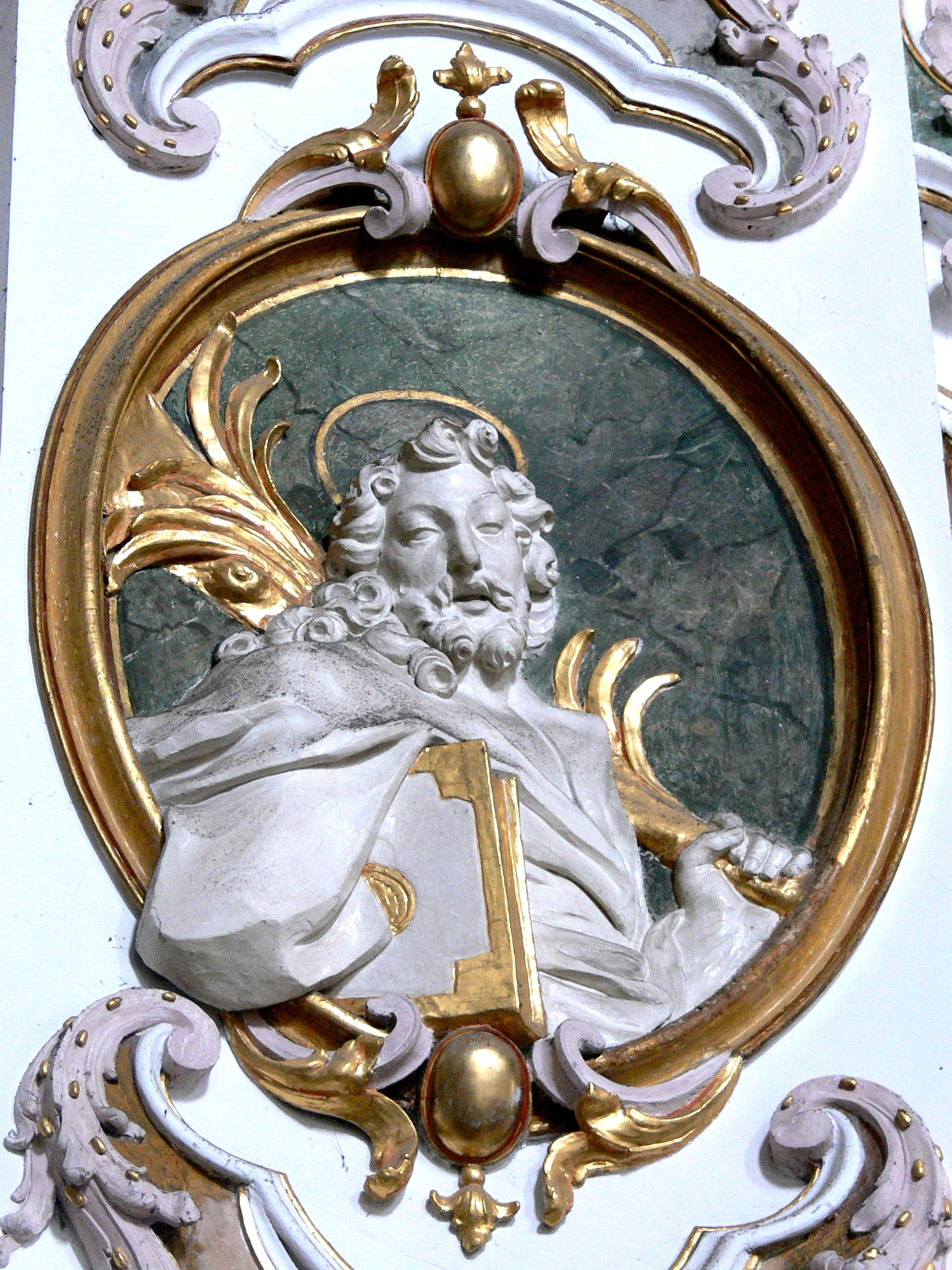
Apostle

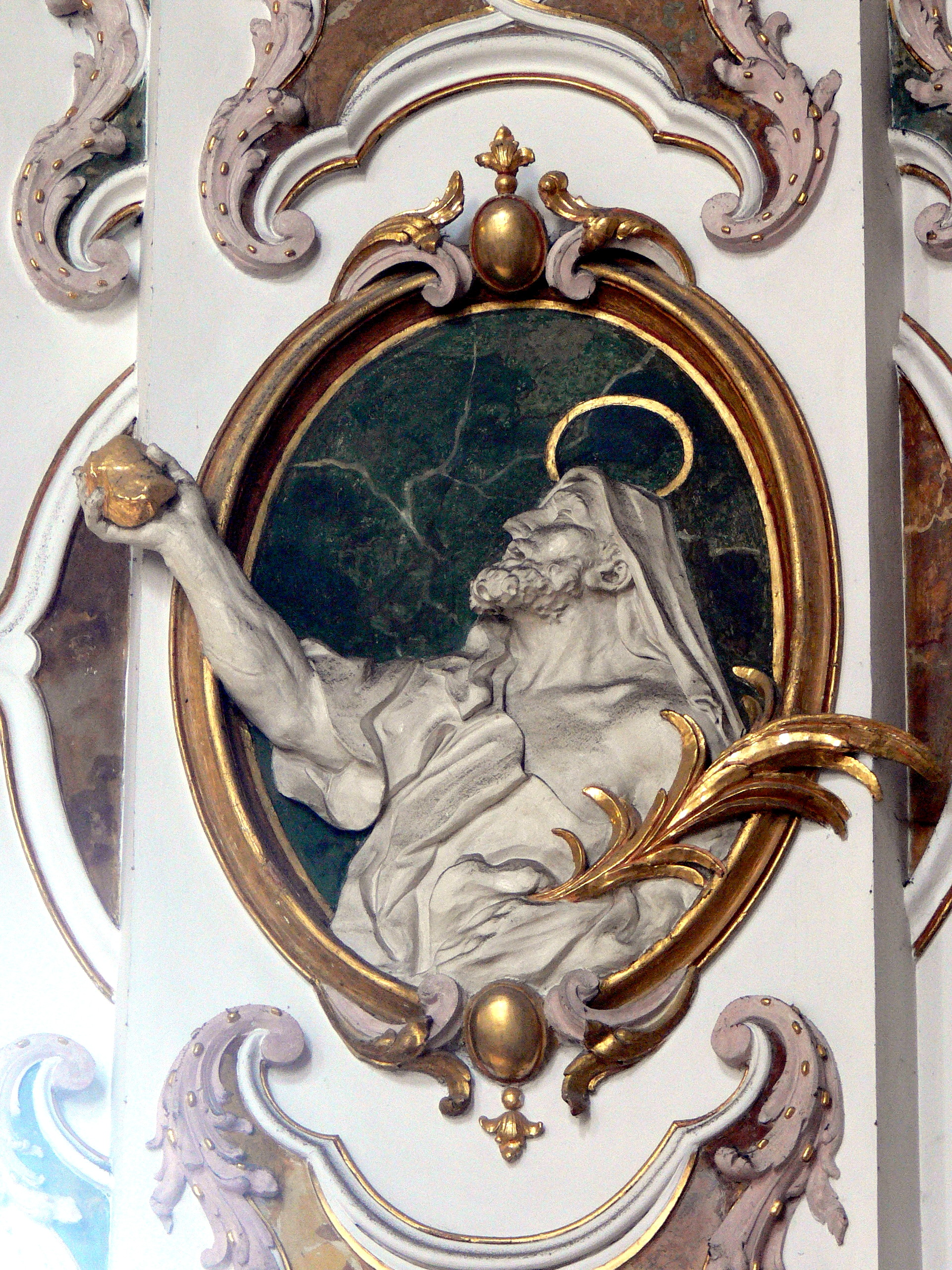
Apostle

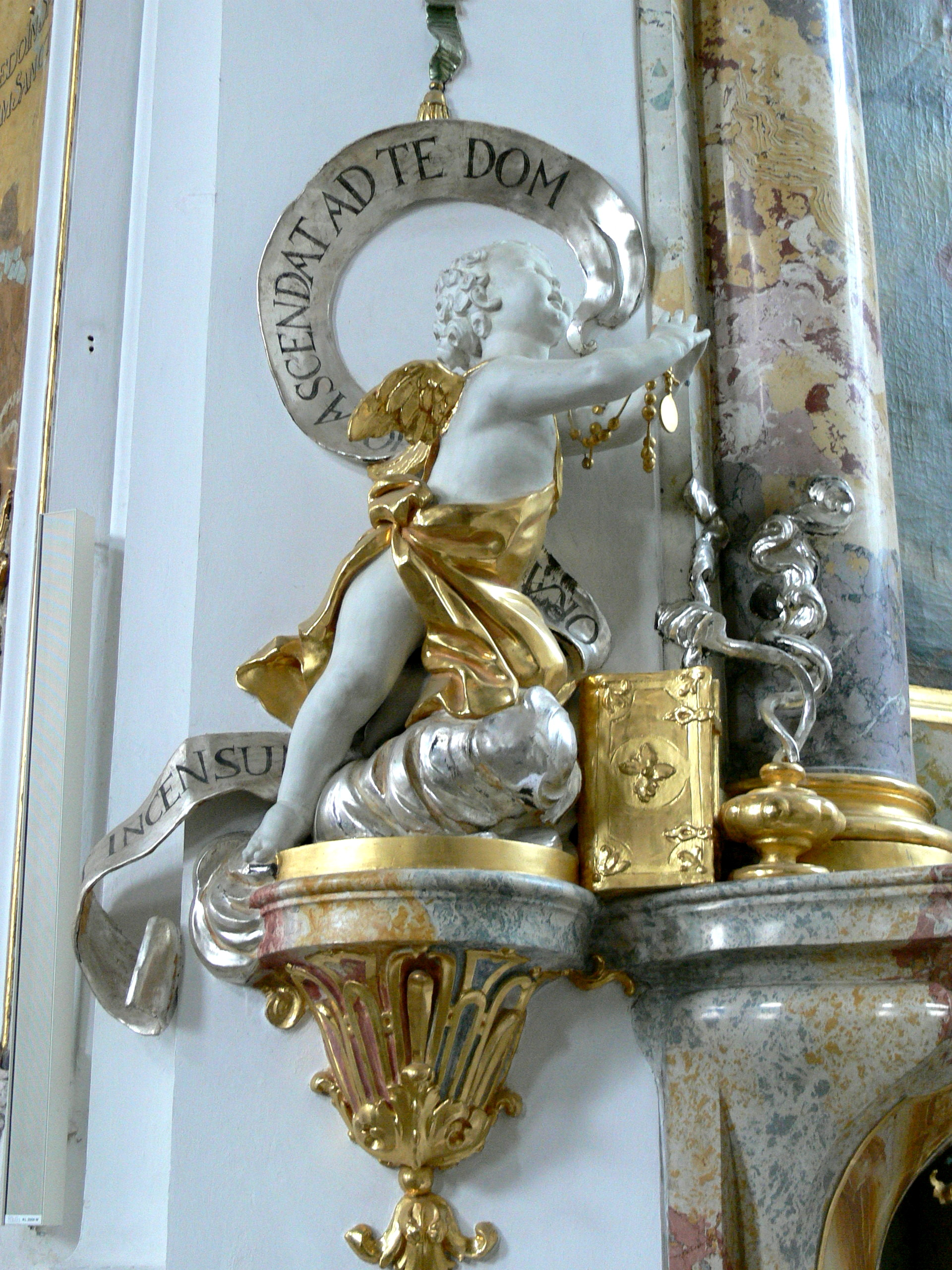
Putto
