= Ettlingen Palace =

Baroque palace in Baden-Württemberg, Germany

Coordinates: 48°56′25.00″N 8°24′21.00″E

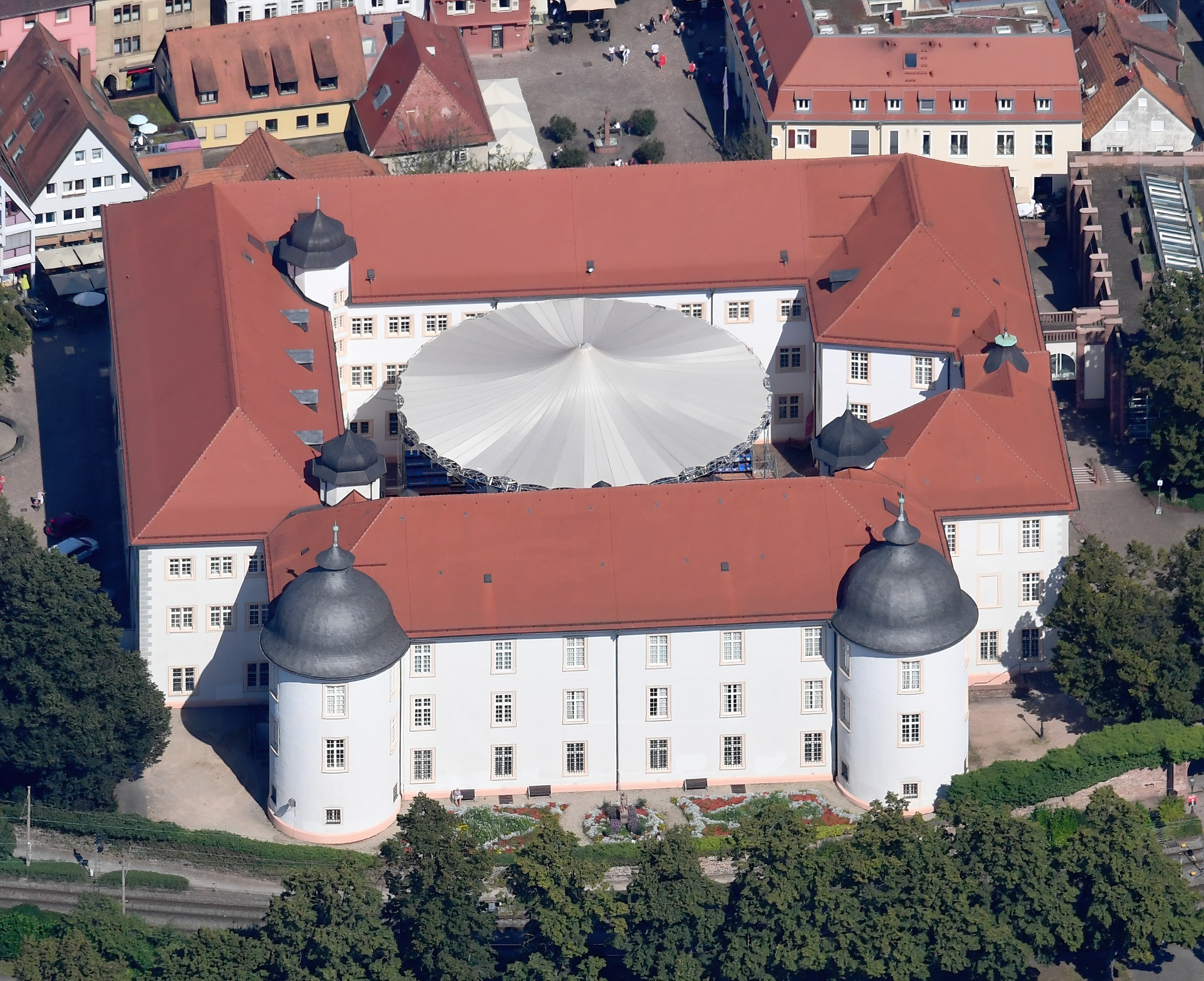
Aerial image of Ettlingen Palace

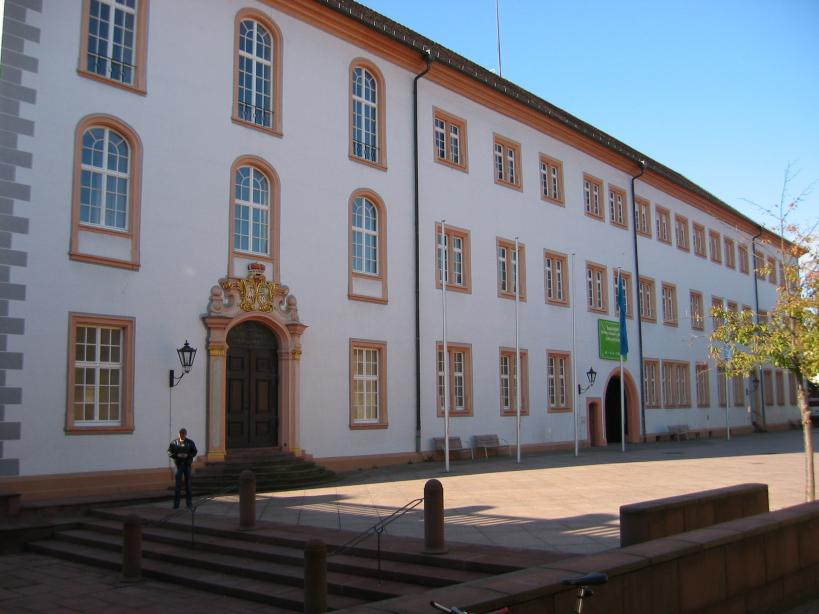
Ettlingen Palace, front view

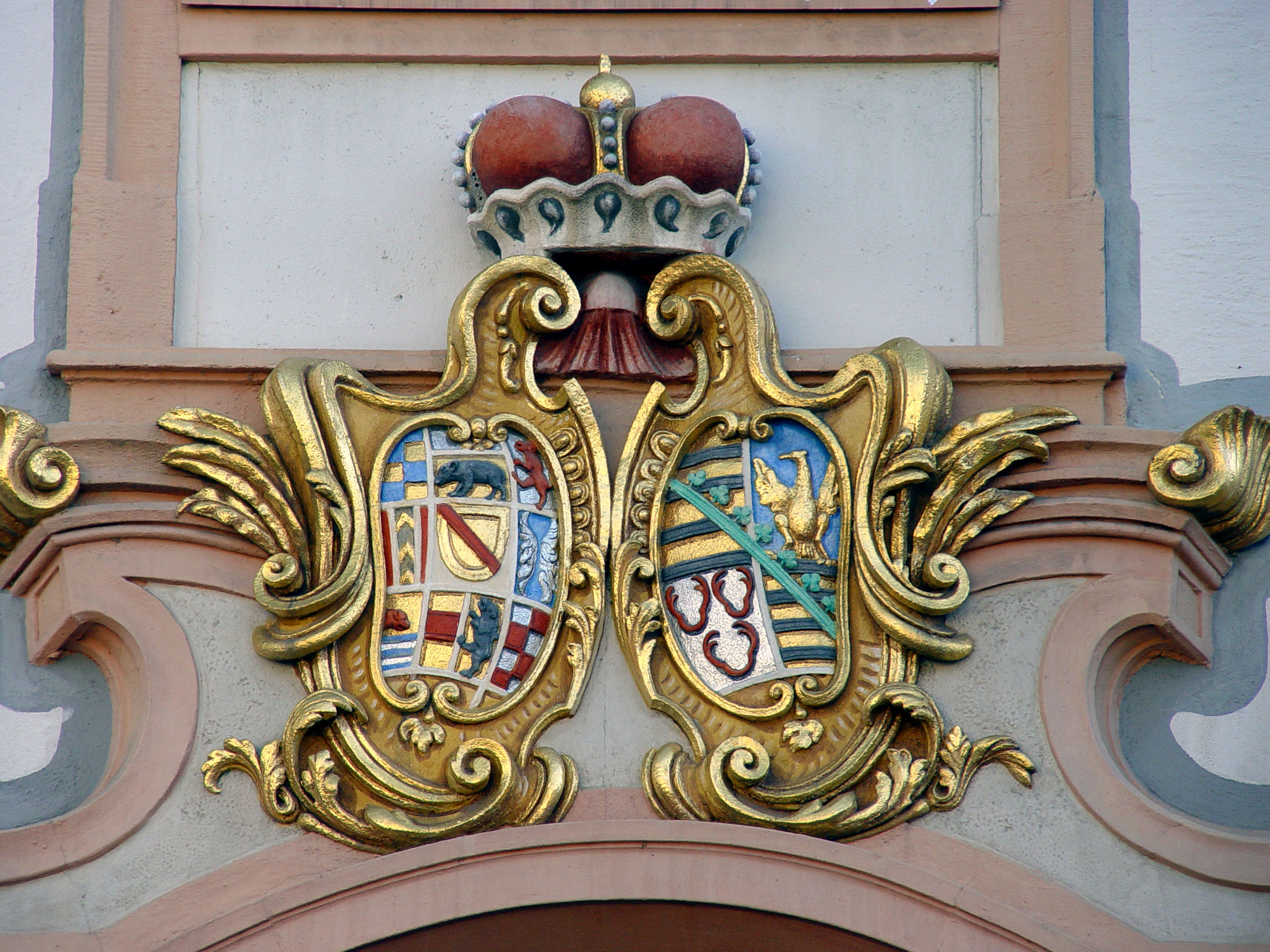
Coat of arms, Ettlingen Palace

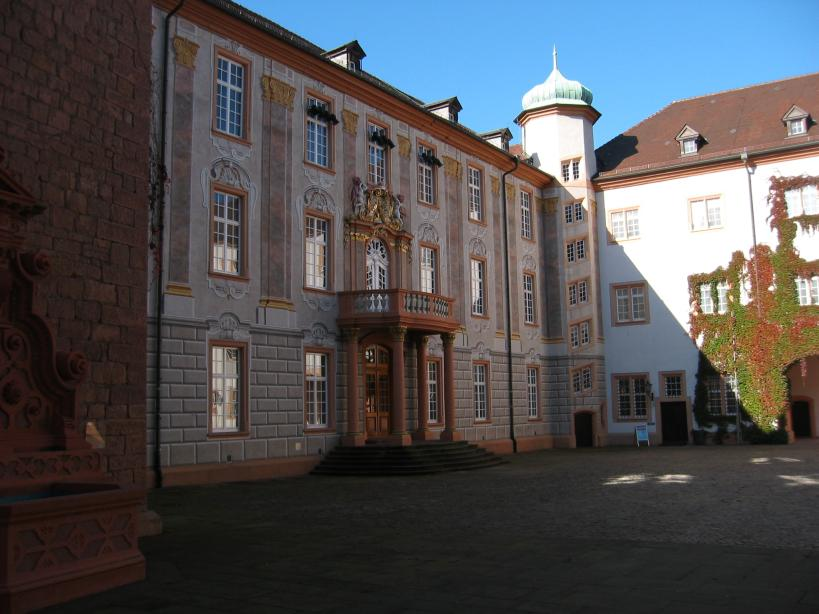
Ettlingen Palace, courtyard

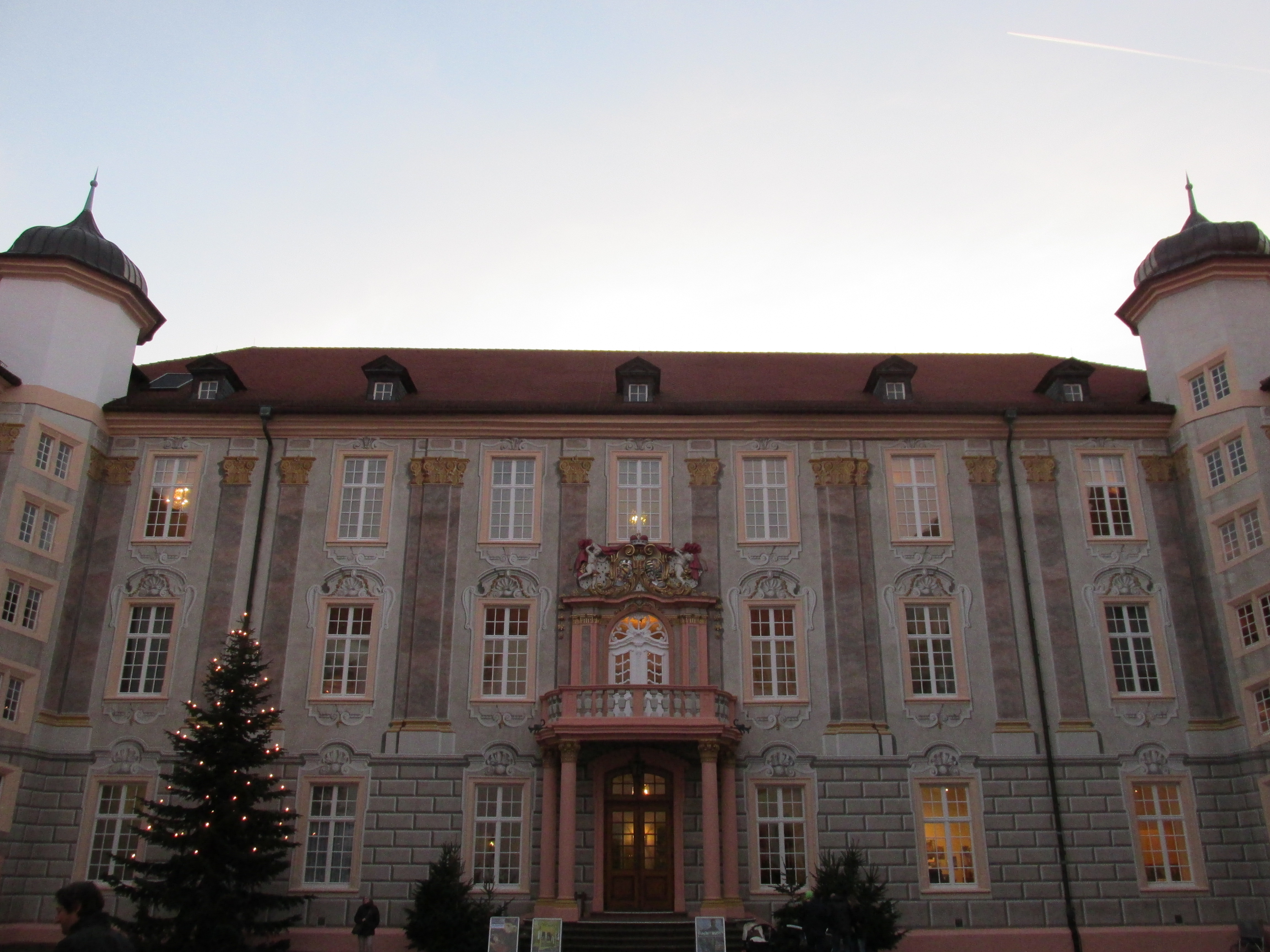
Ettlingen Palace, view from courtyard

Ettlingen Palace is a baroque palace in the centre of Ettlingen, a small city in Baden-Württemberg, Germany.

== Predecessor buildings ==
Today's palace is the successor to two, possibly three, previous buildings. The German Emperor Friedrich II enfeoffed Herman V, Margrave of Baden, with the city of Ettlingen which had been founded by the Staufers. In the mid-13th-century, Hermann's son Margrave Rudolf I of Baden built a castle complex in Ettlingen, possibly on the ruins of a previous building of the Staufers, although the existence of such a predecessor building has not yet been verified. The ground floors of the keep in the castle's inner courtyard were built in the 13th century and still exist today.

In the 16th century, a grand renaissance palace succeeded the 13th century castle. Two turrets were added to the southern wing and the keep was given a timbered upper floor. The renaissance palace with its three wings around the old keep was finished in 1600. In 1689, French troops completely destroyed both the palace and the city during the Palatine war of succession.

== Baroque palace ==
=== Building history ===
After her husband, Margrave Ludwig Wilhelm Türkenlouis, died in 1707, Margravine Augusta Sibylla decided to make her widow's residence at Ettlingen and, from 1727 to 1733, she had the remaining ruins rebuilt. Using sandstone from Lossburg, the master builder Johann Michael Ludwig Rohrer built a luxurious baroque palace with four wings, to serve as a residence for her later years. After Margravine Augusta Sibylla’s death in 1733, the palace was used for multiple purposes for almost two centuries, including as a guest house and as a military hospital. In 1871, the Prussians turned it into an NCO school before the palace became the property of the city of Ettlingen in 1912.

=== Palace courtyard ===
The palace courtyard contains an illusionistic Baroque mural painting on the wall towards the south wing. There is an imposing doorway and a dolphin fountain from 1612. The courtyard is used to stage the Ettlinger Schlossfestspiele, an annual theatre festival in Ettlingen.

=== Asam hall ===
Augusta Sibylla paid particular attention to the construction of the palace chapel which was dedicated to St John Nepomuk. It is decorated with 30 frescoes by the German baroque painter and architect Cosmas Damian Asam (1686–1739) depicting the martyrdom of St John Nepomuk. They are the only remaining frescoes by Cosmas Damian Asam in the Upper Rhine region. Nowadays, the chapel is used as the main hall in which concerts, such as Schubertiades, take place.

=== Great Hall ===
Among the most prestigious rooms of the palace is the Great Hall, which was used as a ballroom by Augusta Sibylla. Its window recesses are decorated with mural paintings. It features a gently curved gallery and a larger Bohemian chandelier.

=== Museum ===
Nowadays, the palace is a museum and event venue. It contains a collection concerning local history and archeology, a collection of regional art works since 1900, particularly works by Karl Hofer as well as a paintings gallery. East Asian handicraft is displayed in the baroque state rooms.
