= Egid Quirin Asam =

German plasterer and sculptor

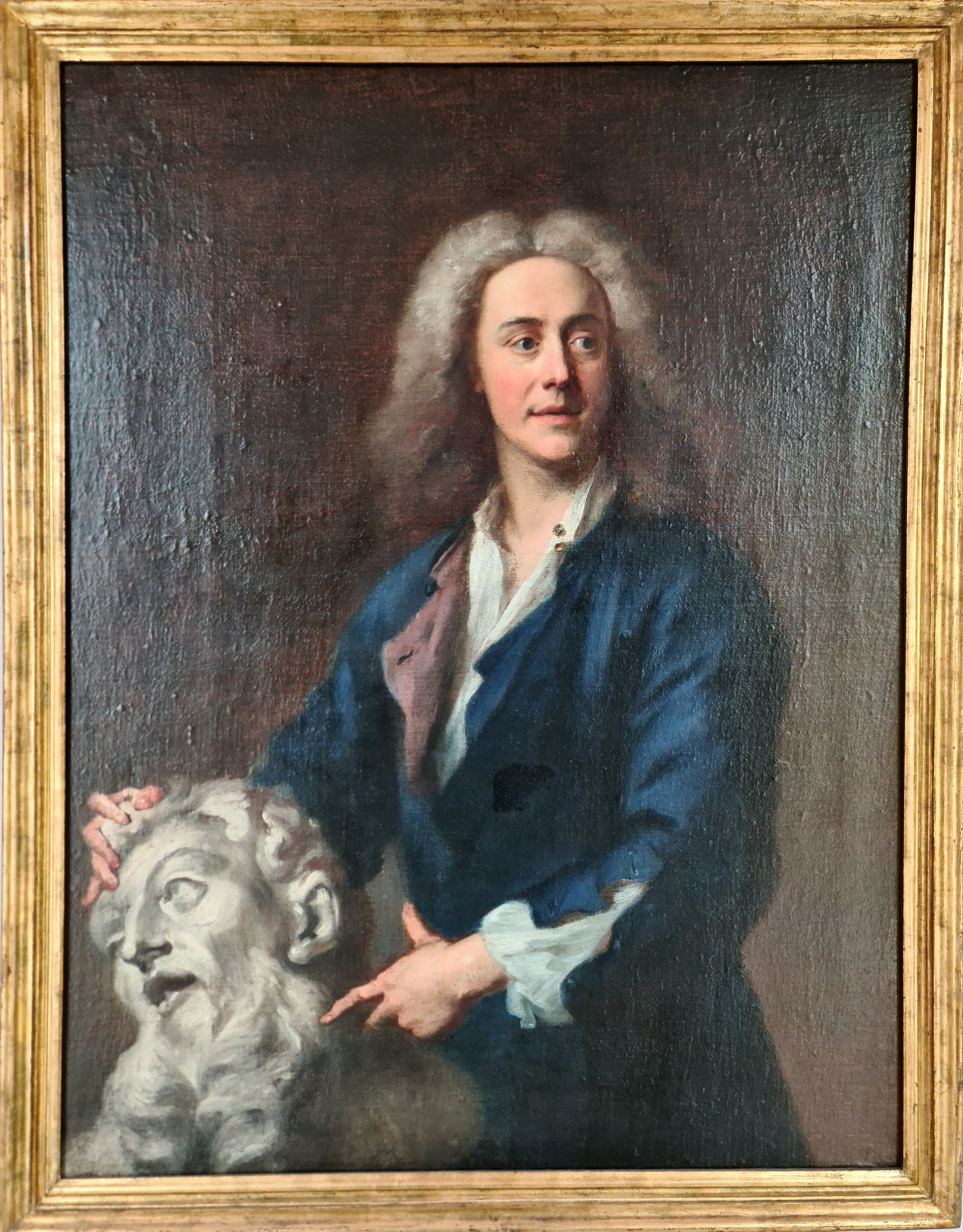
- Born: 1 September 1692; Tegernsee, Electorate of Bavaria
- Died: 29 April 1750 (aged 57); Mannheim, Baden-Württemberg
- Known for: Sculptures
- Style: Late Baroque and Rococo

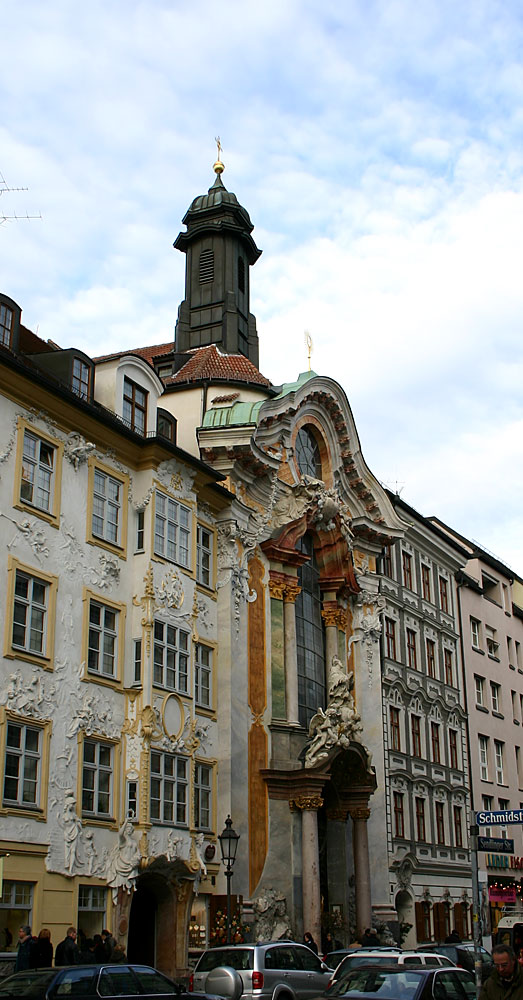
Asam Church in Munich

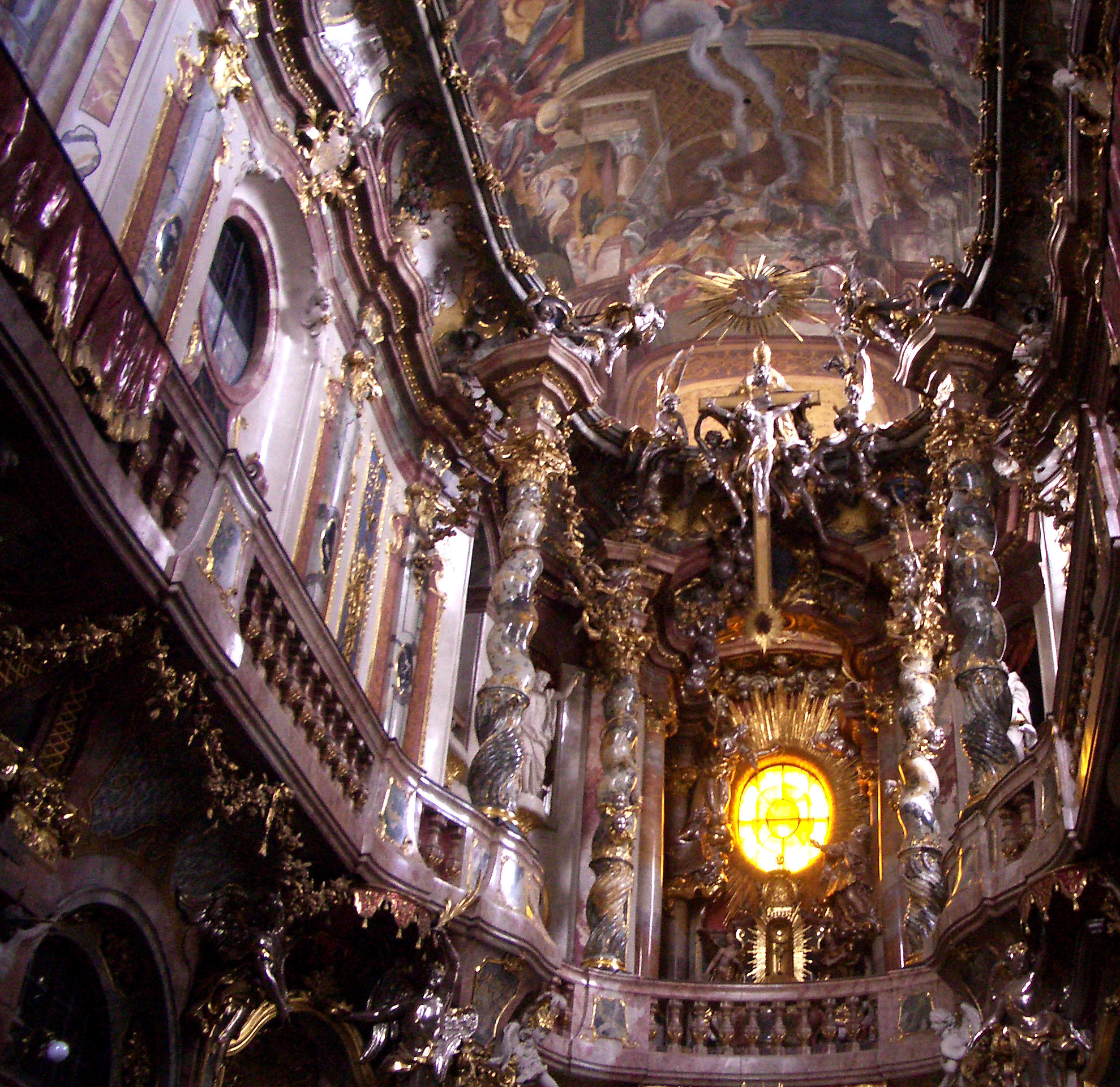
Interior of the Asam Church

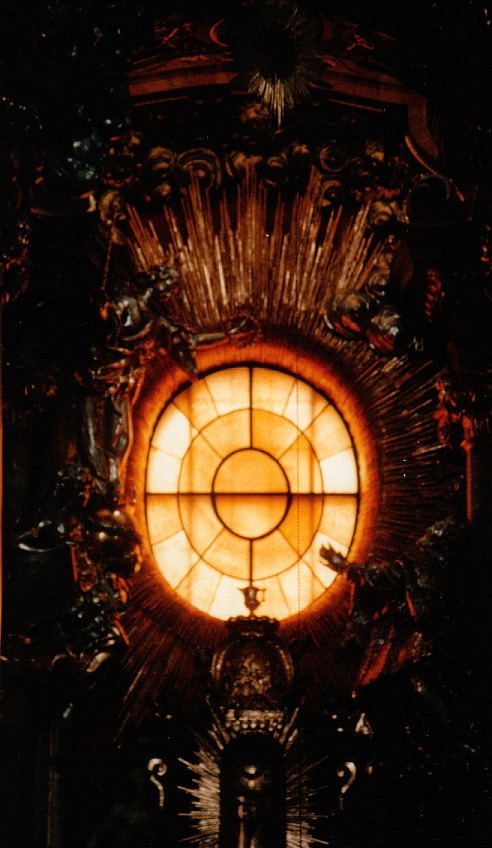
Window over the high altar in the Asam Church

Egid Quirin Asam (1 September 1692 – 29 April 1750) was a German plasterer, sculptor, architect, and painter. He was active during the Late Baroque and Rococo periods.

Born in Tegernsee, Bavaria, Asam worked mainly together with his brother, the architect and painter Cosmas Damian Asam. Because of this, their common work is often attributed to the Asam Brothers. Asam died in Mannheim, Baden-Württemberg.

== Biography ==
Egid Quirin Asam was born on 1 September 1692, in Tegernsee, Bavaria, and baptised the same day. His father was Hans Georg Asam (1649–1741) and his mother was Maria Theresia Asam. Among his eight siblings were Cosmas Damian Asam and Maria Salome Asam.

== Major works ==
The Asam Brothers, singularly and together, were very prolific artists. Some of their major works were:

=== Bavaria ===
- Aldersbach—Monastery Church of Mariae Himmelfahrt (stucco of swirling garlands and capitals and pillars in the Italian Baroque tradition)
- Benediktbeuern—Church of St. Benedikt (silver reliquary of St. Anastasia)
- Freising—Dom St. Maria and St. Korbinian (rococo paintings and stucco) (1723–1724)
- Freystadt—Pilgrimage Church of Maria-Hilf (frescoes)
- Fürstenfeldbruck—Monastery Church of the Ascension of the Blessed Virgin (side altars and high altar)
- Munich—Franciscan Monastery Church of St. Anna im Lehel (altars)
- Munich—Catholic Church of St. Johann Nepomuk (Asam Church) (built and decorated entirely by the Asam Brothers) (1733–1746)
- Munich—Parish Church of St. Peter (furnishings)
- Osterhofen Abbey—Papal Basilica of St. Margaretha (stucco and high altar)
- Regensburg—Benedictine Monastery Church of St. Emmeram (stucco)
- Rohr—Monastery Church of Assumption (high altar) (c. 1717)
- Sandizell—Parish Church of St. Peter (high altar)
- Straubing—Urselinenkirche (architect)
- Weltenburg—Monastery Church of St. George and St. Martin (stucco, high altar, side altars) (1716–1724)

=== Baden-Württemberg ===
- Mannheim—Jesuit Church of St. Ignatius and St. Francis Xavier (ceiling and dome paintings, now destroyed)
- Meßkirch—Johann Nepomuk Chapel in Basilica St. Martin (decorations) (1733–1734)

=== Austria ===
- Innsbruck—Innsbruck Cathedral (Dom zu St. Jakob) (rococo stucco) (1722–1723)
