= Cosmas Damian Asam =

German painter and architect (1686–1739)

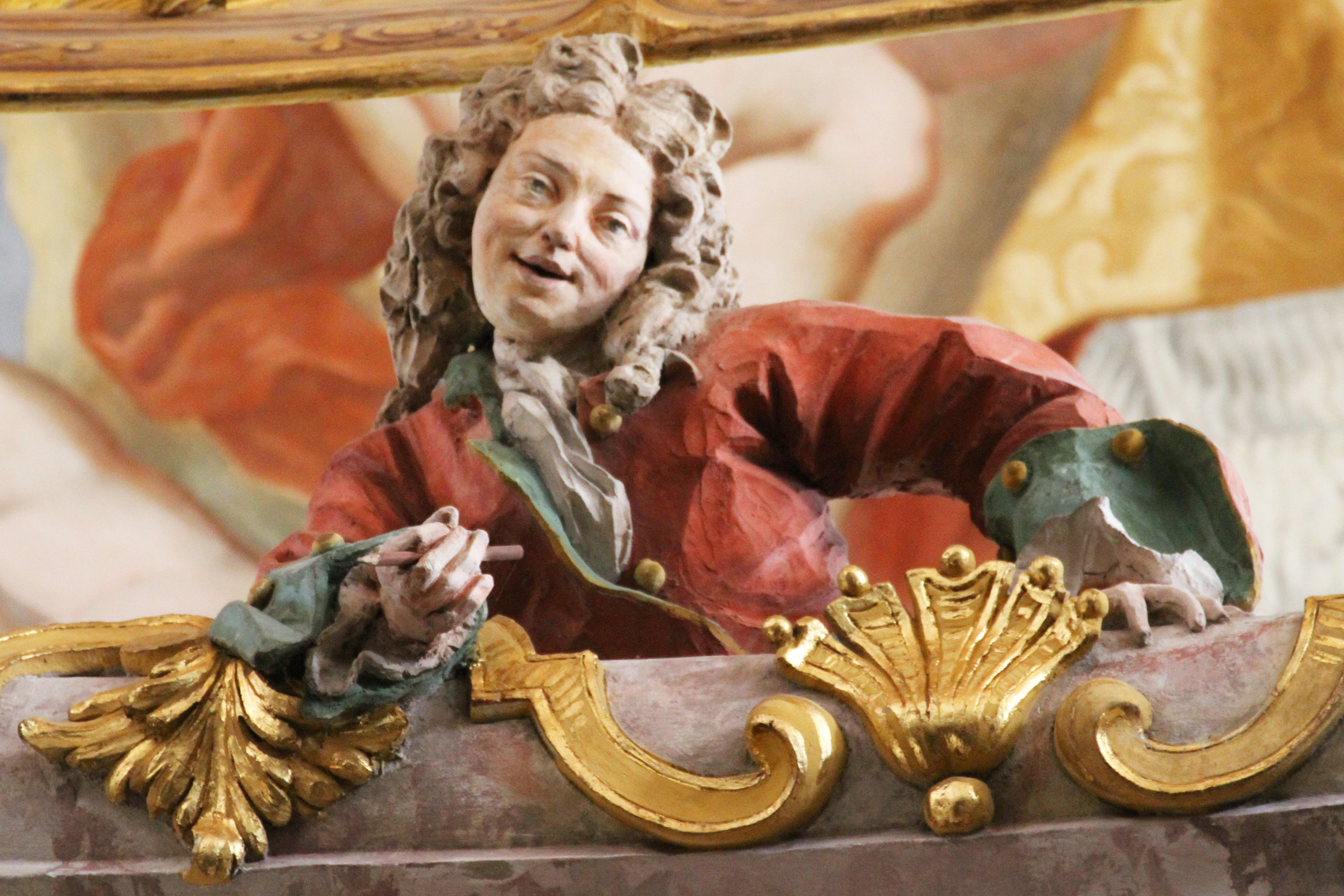
- Cosmas Damian Asam in front of ceiling fresco inside Weltenburg Abbey
- Born: September 29, 1686; Benediktbeuern
- Died: May 10, 1739 (aged 52); Munich
- Style: Baroque

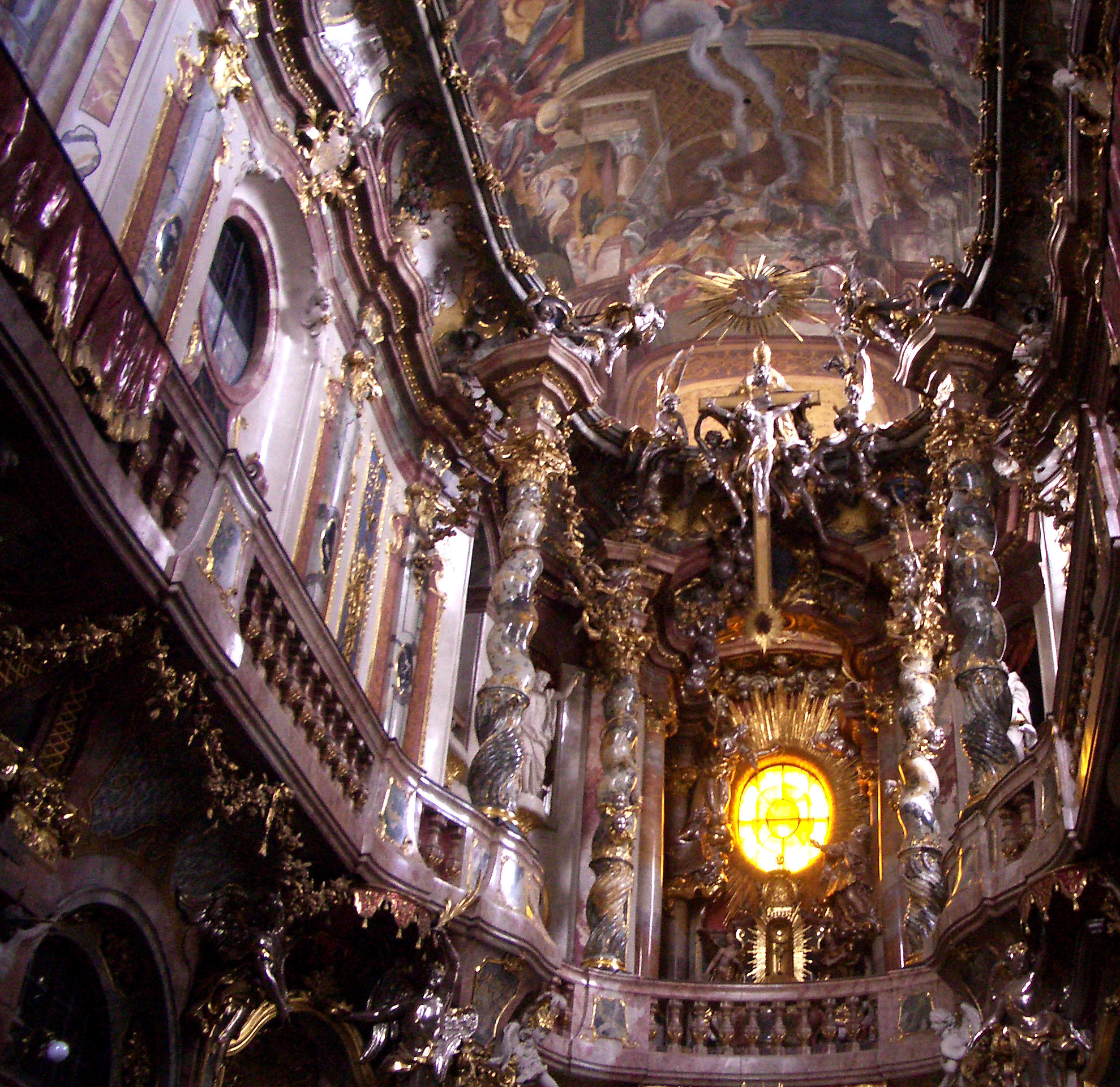
Interior of the Asam Church in Munich

Cosmas Damian Asam (29 September 1686 – 10 May 1739) was a German painter and architect during the late Baroque period. Born in Benediktbeuern, he lived in Rome from 1711 to 1713 to study at the Accademia di San Luca with Carlo Maratta. In 1713, Asam won the Academy's first prize for his drawing of Miracle of Saint Pio. In Germany, he worked with his brother Egid Quirin, a sculptor and stucco worker, on building and decorating entirely new churches (such as the Asam Church in Munich) or redesigning churches in the Baroque style (Regensburg—Benedictine Monastery Church of St. Emmeram). Their joint projects are often attributed to the "Asam Brothers". Cosmas Damian died in Munich.

== Major works ==
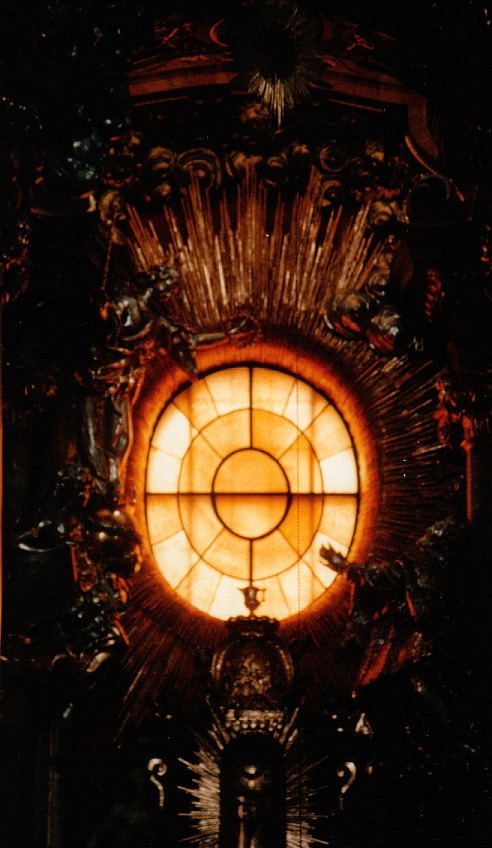
Window over the high altar in the Asamkirche

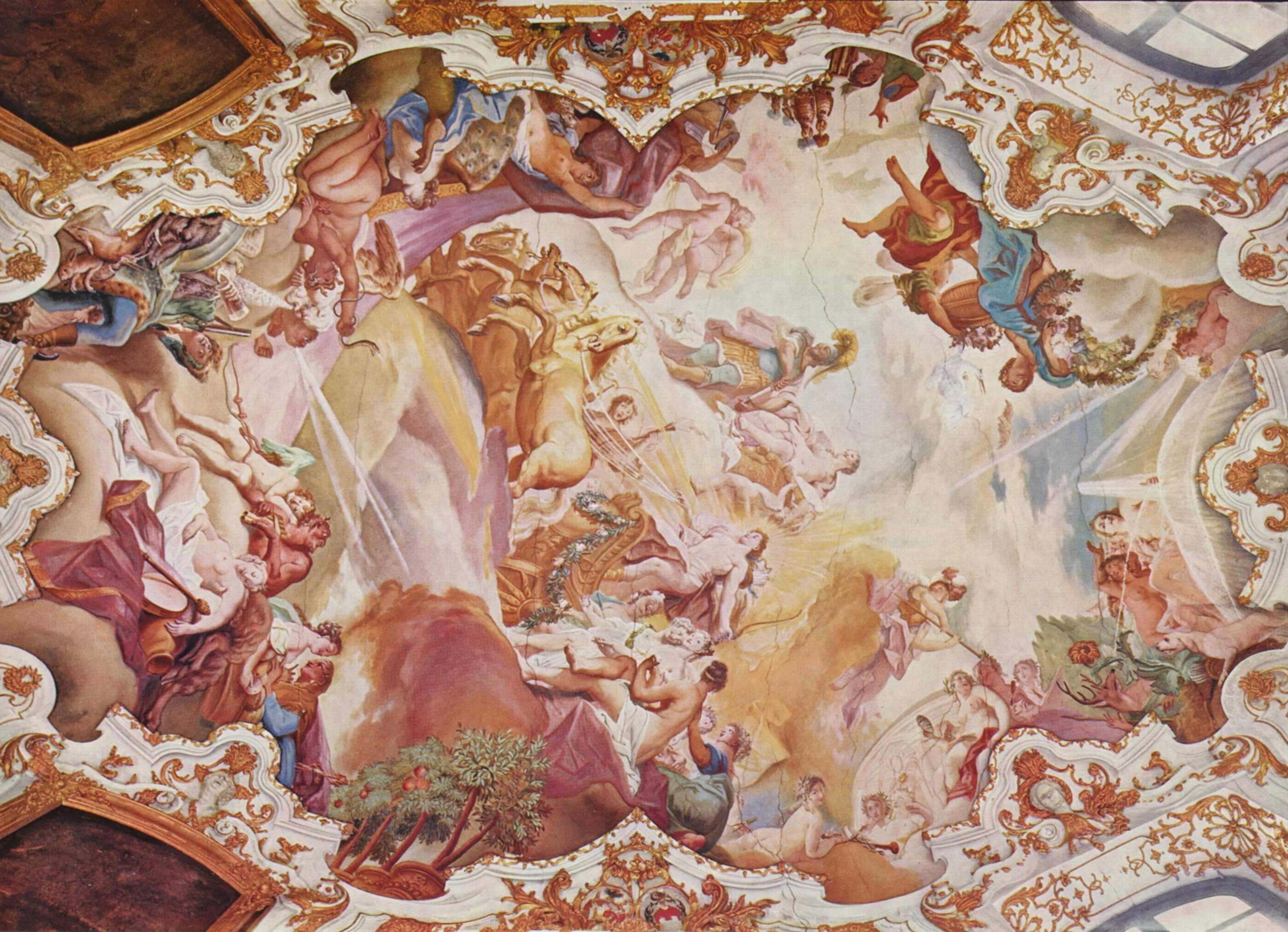
Triumph of Apollo on ceiling of the Schloss (castle) in Alteglofsheim near Regensburg (1730)

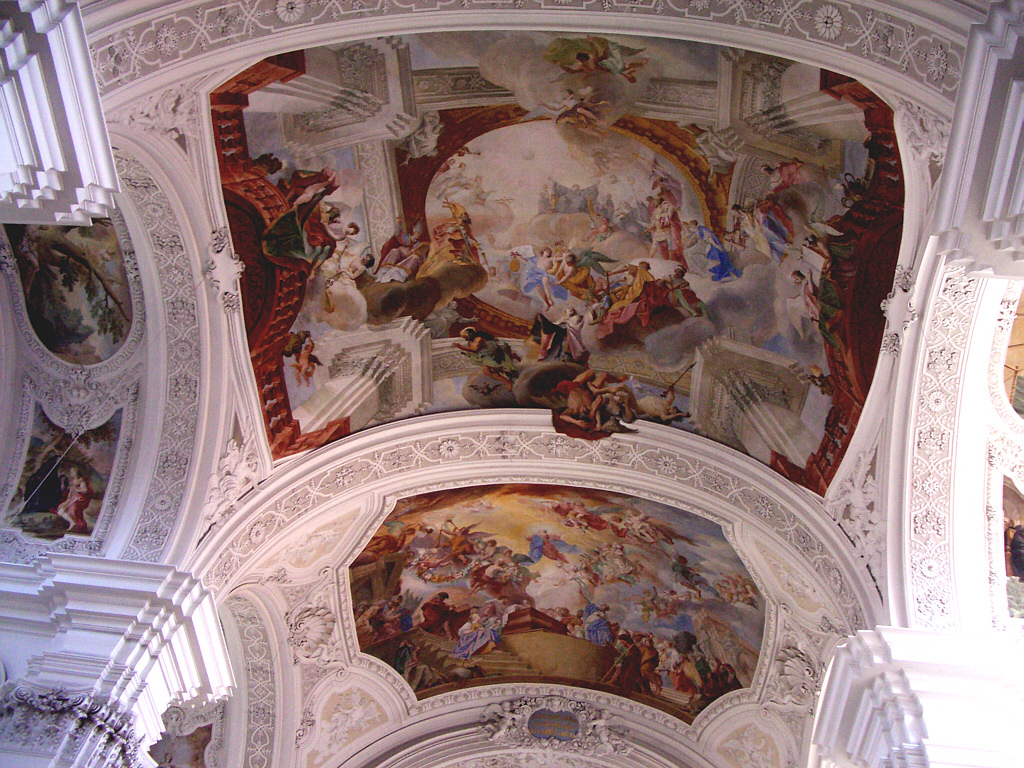
Ceiling painting showing the Triumph of Benedict of Nursia in Weingarten Abbey

The Asam Brothers, singularly and together, were very prolific artists. They typically worked for Benedictine monasteries, though they occasionally took secular commissions. Cosmas Damian's altar depicting The Vision of St. Benedict in Weltenburg—Monastery Church of St. George and St. Martin is thought to be the first realistic depiction of a solar eclipse in Western art history. Some of the major works of Cosmas Damian are the following.

=== Bavaria ===
- Aldersbach—Monastery Church of Mariae Himmelfahrt (frescoes of the Annunciation, Nativity, Passion, Resurrection, Ascension, the Four Evangelists, and the Church Fathers)
- Amberg—Pilgrimage Church of Maria-Hilf (ceiling frescoes of Amberg pilgrimage) (1718)
- Benediktbeuern—Church of St. Benedikt (Antonius Funda altar)
- Freising—Dom St. Maria and St. Korbinian (rococo paintings and stucco) (1723–1724)
- Freystadt—Pilgrimage Church of Maria-Hilf (frescoes)
- Friedberg—Pilgrimage Church of the Peace of the Lord (painting in the chancel) (1738)
- Fürstenfeldbruck—Monastery Church of the Ascension of the Blessed Virgin (vault painting)
- Ingolstadt—Asam Church of Maria Viktoria (frescos, possibly architect)
- Metten—Benedictine Monastery Church of St. Michael (high altar painting of Lucifer Destroyed by St. Michael)
- Sloderdjik Church of Christ [Altar paintings of the Ascension]
- Munich—Franciscan Monastery Church of St. Anna im Lehel (ceiling paintings, restored in 1971–1972 after World War II damage, and altars)
- Munich—Catholic Church of St. Johann Nepomuk (Asam Church) (built and decorated entirely by the Asam Brothers) (1733–1746)
- Munich—Dreifaltigkeitskirche (dome fresco of the Adoration of the Trinity)
- Osterhofen Abbey—Papal Basilica of St. Margaretha (frescoes)
- Regensburg—Benedictine Monastery Church of St. Emmeram (frescoed walls and ceilings)
- Schleissheim—Neues Schloss (New Castle) (vault fresco)
- Straubing—Urselinenkirche (interior paintings)
- Weltenburg—Monastery Church of St. George and St. Martin (architect and paintings, with his brother Egid Quirin portrayed as an angel in one of the frescoes, high altar, side altars) (1716–1724)

=== Baden-Württemberg ===
- Bruchsal—Schloss church decoration (1730) (now destroyed)
- Ettlingen—Schloss chapel (design and ceiling paintings) in Ettlingen Palace
- Mannheim—Schloss (architectural design and ceiling paintings, now restored after World War II damage)
- Meßkirch—Johann Nepomuk Chapel in Basilica St. Martin (decorations) (1733–1734)
- Weingarten—Benedictine Monastery Church of St. Martin of Tours and St. Oswald (frescoes)

=== Austria ===
- Innsbruck—Dom zu St. Jakob (Innsbruck Cathedral) (ceiling frescoes on the life of St. James) (1722–1723)
- Innsbruck—Landtagssaal (State Parliament Hall) in the Alte Landhaus (ceiling and wall frescoes) (1725–1728)

=== Poland ===
- Wahlstatt—Legnickie Pole (Wahlstatt, Lower Silesia) (The Finding of the True Cross, ceiling fresco) (1733)
