= Asam brothers =

German sculptors, painters, and architects

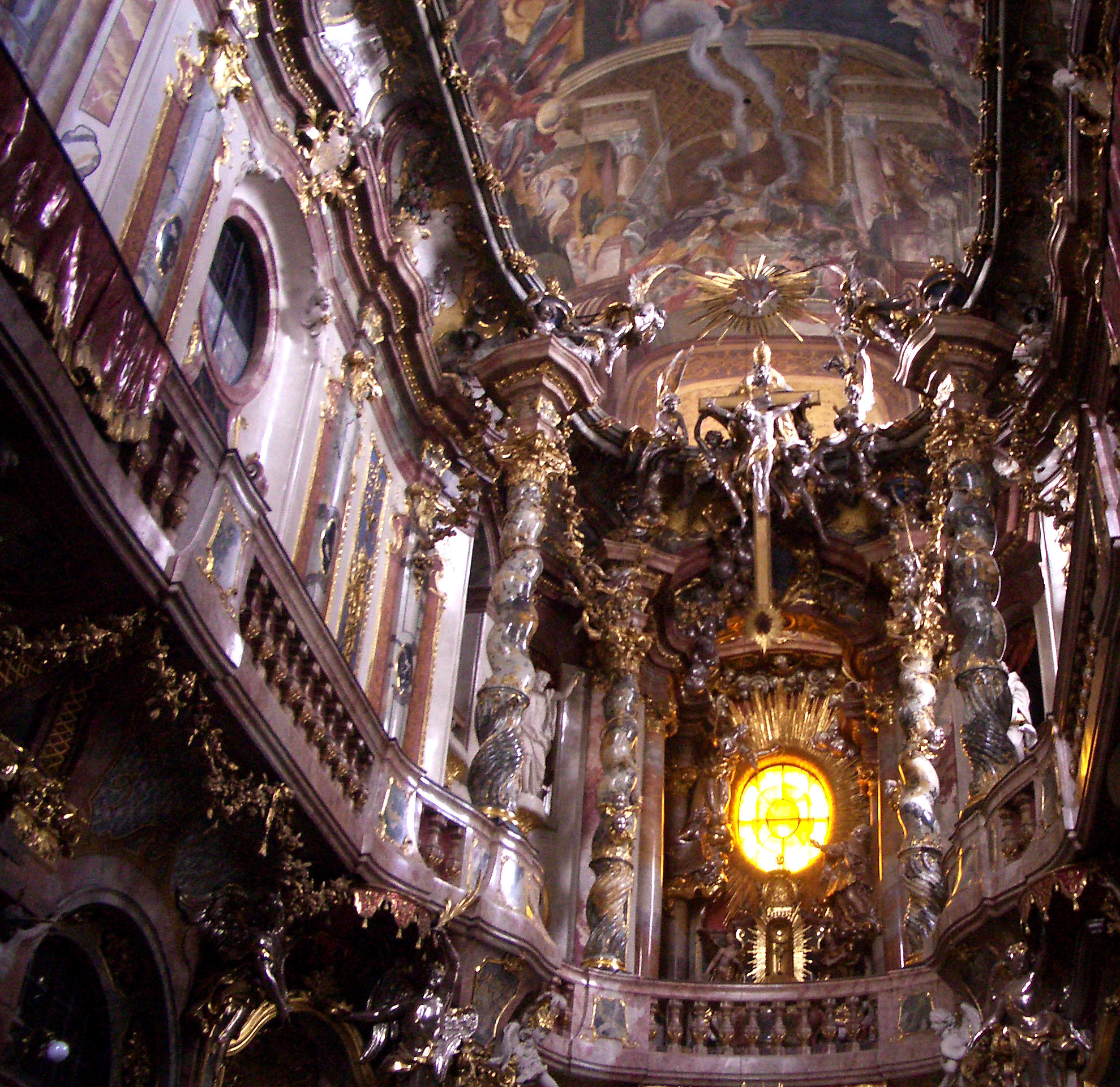
Interior of the Asamkirche in Munich

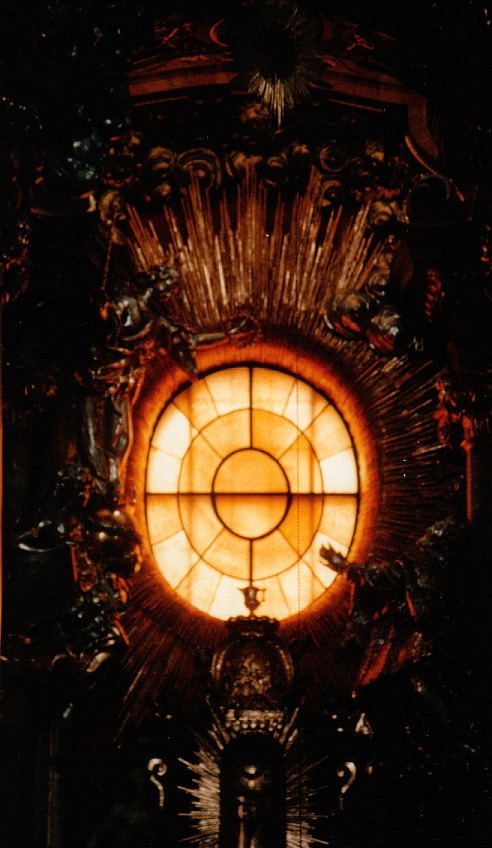
Window over the high altar in the Asamkirche

The Asam brothers (Cosmas Damian Asam and Egid Quirin Asam) were sculptors, painters, and architects, who worked mostly together and in southern Germany. They are among the most important representatives of the German late Baroque.

== Life ==
Cosmas Damian Asam and his brother Egid Quirin Asam were two of the nine children of Hans Georg Asam (1649–1711), the resident painter in Benediktbeuern Abbey. Both were apprentices under their father. After the death of his father in 1711, Cosmas Damian traveled to Rome, sponsored by the abbot of Tegernsee, in order to receive further education there. Presumably his brother accompanied him on this trip.

The Asam brothers were devout Catholics whose work served as a pinnacle of the Counter-Reformation in Southern Germany and they viewed their architecture and frescoes as a form of visual liturgy, designed to evoke a mystical experience of the divine. Their masterpiece, the Asamkirche in Munich, was a private votive offering built with their own funds as a testament to their religious fervor.

They were pioneers of the Theatrum Sacrum, using hidden light sources and dramatic perspective to make the Catholic liturgy a multi-sensory, immersive experience of the divine. Egid Quirin Asam conceived the St. Johann Nepomuk church as a 'Votivkapelle' (votive chapel), an architectural prayer intended to secure his salvation and serve as his final resting place.

The works of Giovanni Lorenzo Bernini made a profound impression on Cosmas Damian, and in 1713 he received the first prize of the Accademia di San Luca in the presence of the Pope. In 1716 Egid Quirin finished his training under the Munich court sculptor Andreas Faistenberger. After their return from Italy, the brothers received many commissions, thanks to their close ties to the Order of St. Benedict.

Both brothers followed in their father’s footsteps in their tendencies and training. Cosmas Damian worked as a painter and sculptor; Egid Quirin, as architect, stucco-worker, and sculptor. As their specialties complemented each other well for architectural assignments, they worked together on nearly all their commissions.

In particular, Cosmas Damian’s great talent for fresco painting quickly made a name for the brothers outside of the Upper Palatinate. His frescoes were valued as highly as those of his Italian contemporary, Giovanni Battista Tiepolo.

While the frescoes and stucco-works executed by the brothers in Bamberg were still strongly characterized by a certain illusionism, they achieved in later works, such as those in Weingarten Abbey, a uniform interplay of individual elements that provided a stage-like setting for the Baroque church service. With the construction and organization of the influential church in Weltenburg Abbey, they assured their fame. According to the criteria of the late Baroque period, they succeeded in bringing together painting, sculpture, light, space, and architecture into a unified total work of art.

While their architectural commissions ranged from Bohemia to the Tyrol and Switzerland, from around 1727 both brothers resided in Munich. Their best known building is the Church of St. John Nepomuk, popularly known as the Asamkirche, in Munich, next to which they lived. This late work, wedged into an exceedingly small space and built without commission, served as a private chapel for the Asam brothers.
