= Asam Church, Munich =

Baroque church in Munich, Germany

Coordinates: 48°08′06″N 11°34′10″E

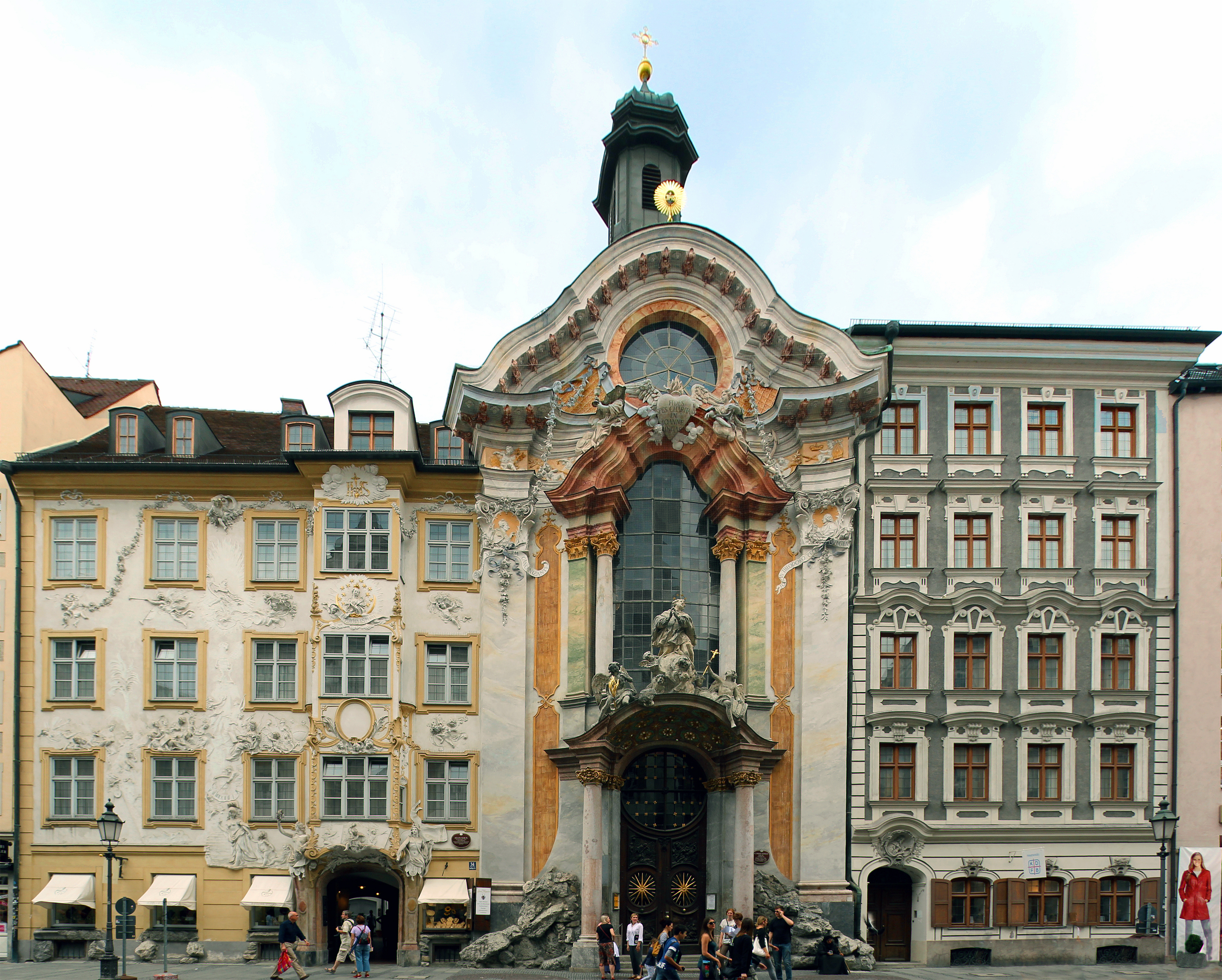
Asamkirche Munich

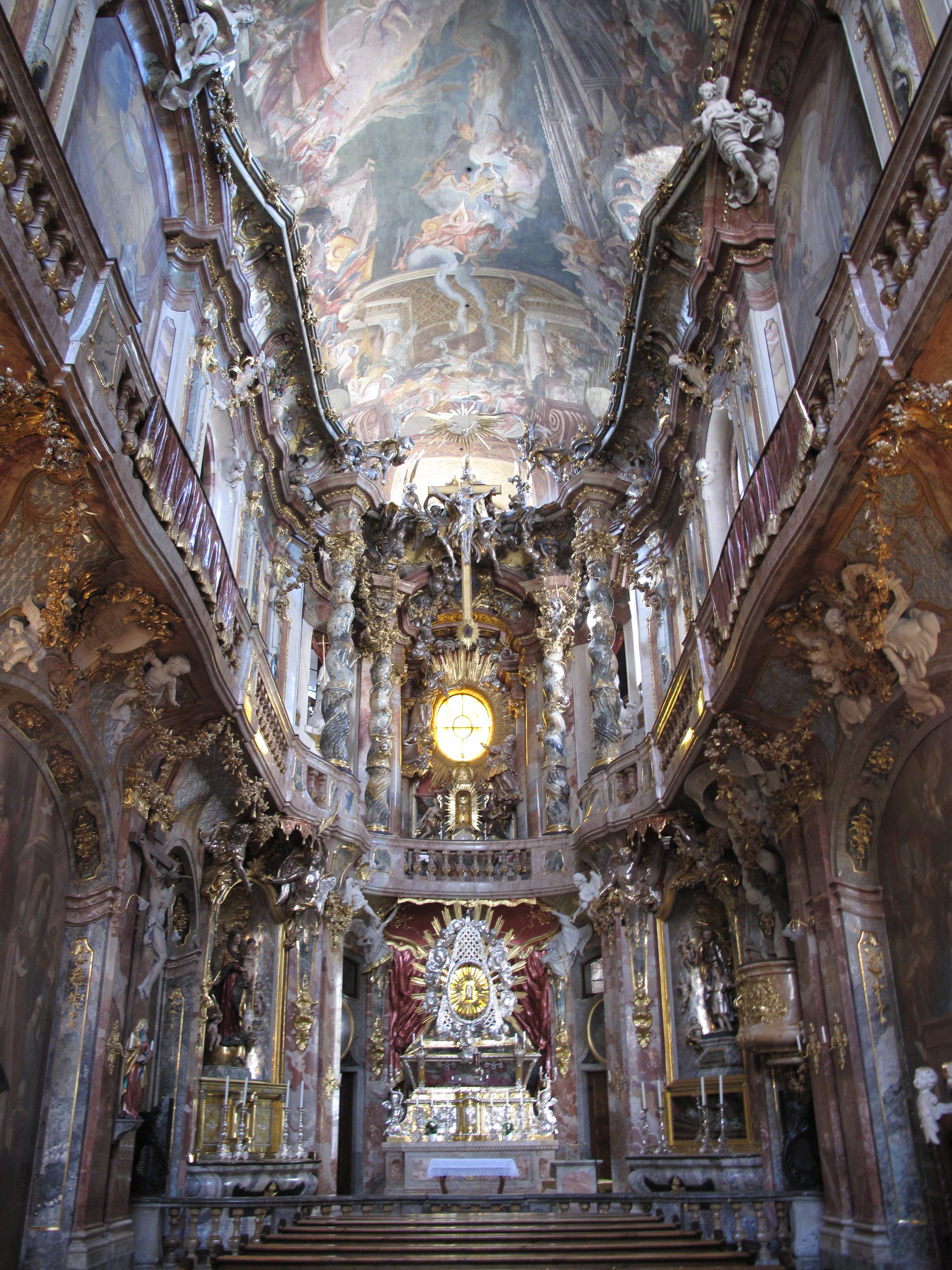
Asamkirche Interior

St. Johann Nepomuk, better known as the Asam Church (German: Asamkirche), is a Baroque church in Munich, Bavaria, Germany. It was built from 1733 to 1746 by a pair of brothers, sculptor Egid Quirin Asam and painter Cosmas Damian Asam, as their private church. It is considered to be one of the most important buildings of the southern German Late Baroque.

== Architecture ==
The church was not commissioned, but built as a private chapel for the greater glory of God and the salvation of the builders. This also allowed the Asam brothers to build in line with their ideas as independent contractors. For example, Egid Quirin Asam could see the altar through a window of his private house next to the church (Asamhaus). He also designed the church as a Beichtkirche (confession church) for the youth. The small church therefore has seven confessionals with allegorical scenes.

The Baroque façade is integrated into the houses of the Sendlingerstraße and swings slightly convex outward. St. Johann Nepomuk was built in a confined space, its property just 22 by 8 m. Even more astonishing is the artistry of the two builders, who were able to harmoniously unite in the two-story space architecture, painting, and sculpture. The indirect lighting in the choir area is especially well done: hidden behind the cornice window, the Trinity figures are illuminated effectively from behind. The cornice itself seems to swing up and down on its curved construction.

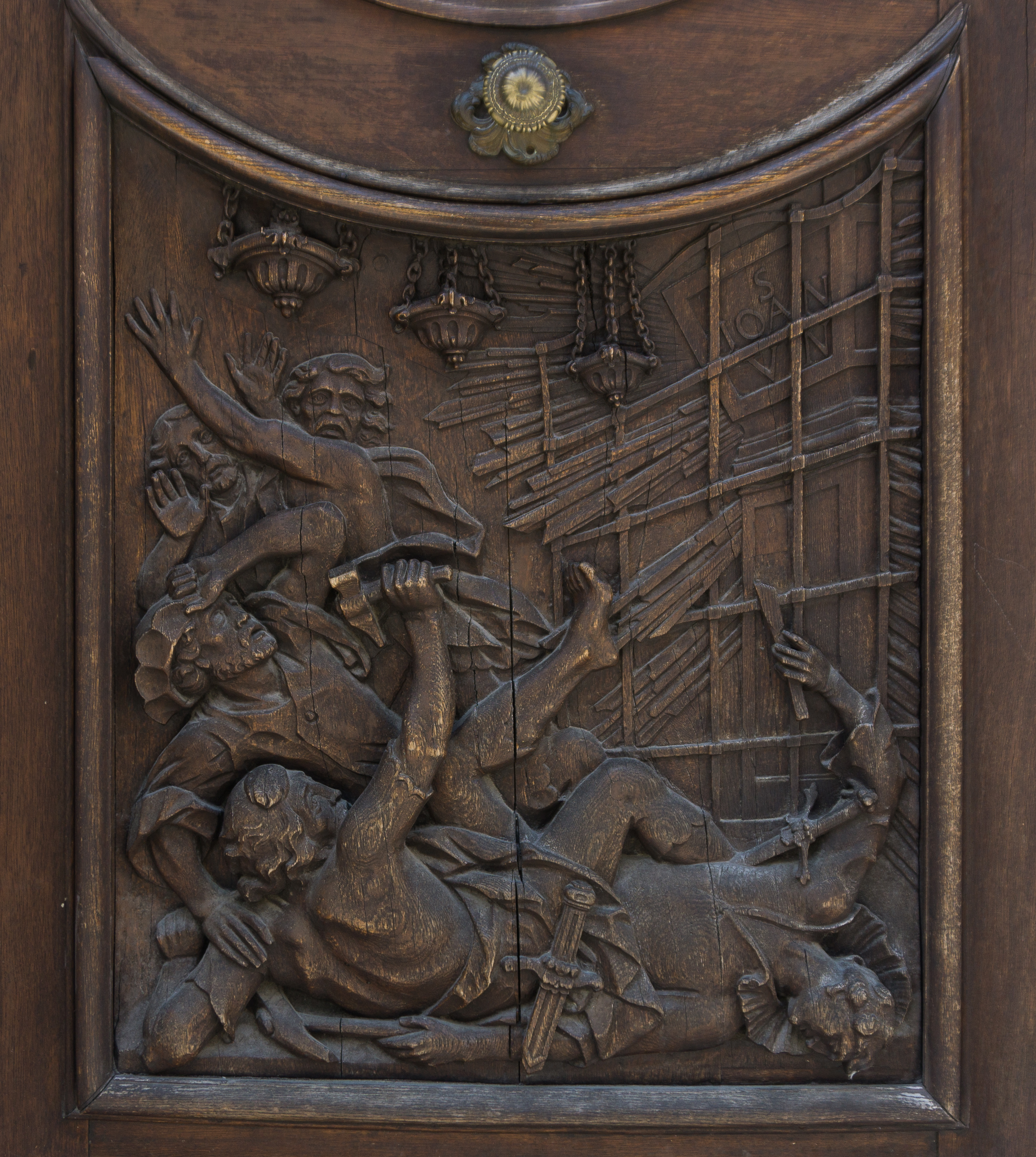
Main door panel

The interior is divided vertically into three sections, which increase in brightness from the bottom upwards. The lowermost portion of the benches, for church visitors, is kept relatively dark; its design symbolizes the suffering of the world. The second section, located above, is colored white and blue, and reserved for the emperor. The uppermost portion of the indirect and hidden illuminated ceiling painting is dedicated to God and eternity.

The ceiling fresco "Life of Saint Nepomuk" is considered a masterpiece of Cosmas Damian Asam. The high altar of the Asam Church is framed by four spiral columns. At the high altar, these four columns are used as a reference to the four Bernini columns over the grave of St. Peter in St. Peter's in Rome. Previously, the brothers Asam had studied in Italy at the Accademia di San Luca, under Lorenzo Bernini. At the top is God, the Saviour. Below the tabernacle, a relic of John of Nepomuk is kept. Two angels, sculpted by Ignaz Günther, flank the gallery altar and were added at a later date.

Compared to other more strictly patterned Baroque churches, the Asamkirche shows some peculiarities due to its status as a private chapel. The church altar is situated in the west, not the east as usual. In addition, the crucifix opposite the pulpit was hung unusually low. In Baroque churches it was to hang above the pulpit, so that the preacher had to look up to Jesus Christ.

In a bomb attack in 1944, the choir was heavily damaged. Interior restoration from 1975 to 1983 proceeded according to source study, restoring a hypothetical original appearance of the choir.

== Asamhaus ==
The Asams bought four houses for their project, the southern house built in the 16th century. When Egid took possession of the house, he sculpted lavish exterior stucco ornamentation as was typical for the South German rococo, an ornament technique inspired by Lüftlmalerei (an artistic expression of paintings on the outside walls of houses in Bavaria and Tyrol). The two houses in the middle were demolished to build the church. The northern house became a priest's residence, and also shows a rococo facade.

Due to public pressure, the brothers were forced to make the church accessible to the public.
