= Altomonte (surname) =

Altomonte is a surname. Notable people with the surname include:

- Bartolomeo Altomonte (1694–1783), Austrian painter, son of Martino
- Martino Altomonte (1657–1745), Italian painter of Austrian descent
