= Säusenstein Abbey =

Coordinates: 48.192°N 15.115°E

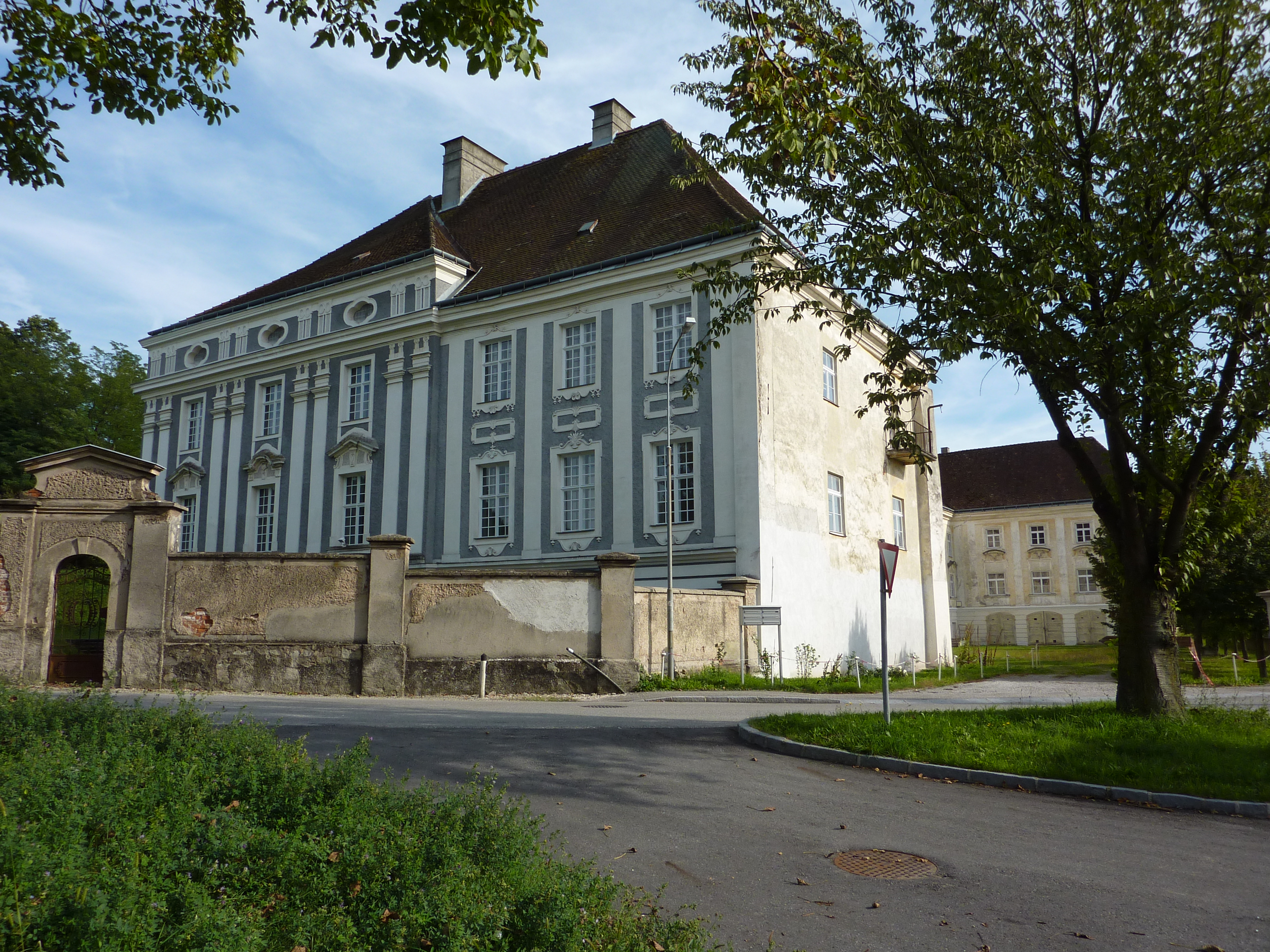
Säusenstein Abbey

Säusenstein Abbey (German: Stift Säusenstein) is a former Cistercian abbey in Säusenstein in Lower Austria, sometimes known as Schloss Säusenstein ("Säusenstein Castle").

== History ==
The foundation charter is dated 19 September 1336, when the founder, the nobleman Eberhard of Wallsee, granted the site and a substantial endowment to the Cistercian monks of Wilhering Abbey, although he had previously negotiated unsuccessfully with the Augustinian Canons, and an earlier attempted settlement from the Cistercian Zwettl Abbey had come to nothing.

The abbey suffered from the Turkish invasions of the 16th century, particularly in connection with the Siege of Vienna in 1526. Although forethought on the part of abbots saved many of the abbey's valuables by sending them for safekeeping elsewhere in advance of the incursions, the community was unable to escape the punishing taxes of the war period, and descended into poverty: one abbot was nearly arrested for failure to pay taxes. During the Reformation, another abbot absconded with the cashbox.

The abbey survived nevertheless and from the later 17th century onwards regained morale and wealth. The premises were rebuilt, and the study of theology and philosophy flourished.

However, the rationalist reforms of the Emperor Joseph II brought about the dissolution of the abbey on 21 May 1789. The abbot of Seitenstetten was appointed administrator and a number of Säusenstein's treasures were removed to Seitenstetten. The buildings of Säusenstein were used as a military hospital by Napoleon's troops during their occupation of Austria, and the buildings were badly damaged by French excesses, resulting among other things in the almost total destruction in about 1801 of the church by arson. Further damage occurred in 1805 and 1809.

It was about this time that the abbey began to be known locally as "Schloss" ("Castle") Säusenstein.

On the administrator's death in 1812, Säusenstein was taken over by the state, and was sold off in 1825 into private ownership. More destruction and neglect of the buildings followed, and significant demolition took place in 1856, including the loss of two sides of the cloisters, with the construction of the Austrian Western Railway across the site.

The last private owners sold it to the German government. Between 1939 and 1945 it served as an experimental agricultural institution. After the end of World War II Säusenstein lay in the Russian Zone and was occupied by Soviet troops for 10 years. When they left in 1955 the Austrian Forestry Commission took the site over but paid little attention to the preservation of the buildings.

== Restoration ==
The badly neglected complex was acquired in 1979 by the artist and Christian mystic Luise Wittmann (1902–2005) and her architect son Karl (1928–2004), who over many years restored the remaining buildings and opened them to the public. Their successor continues their work.
