= Wilhering Abbey =

Austrian Cistercian monastery

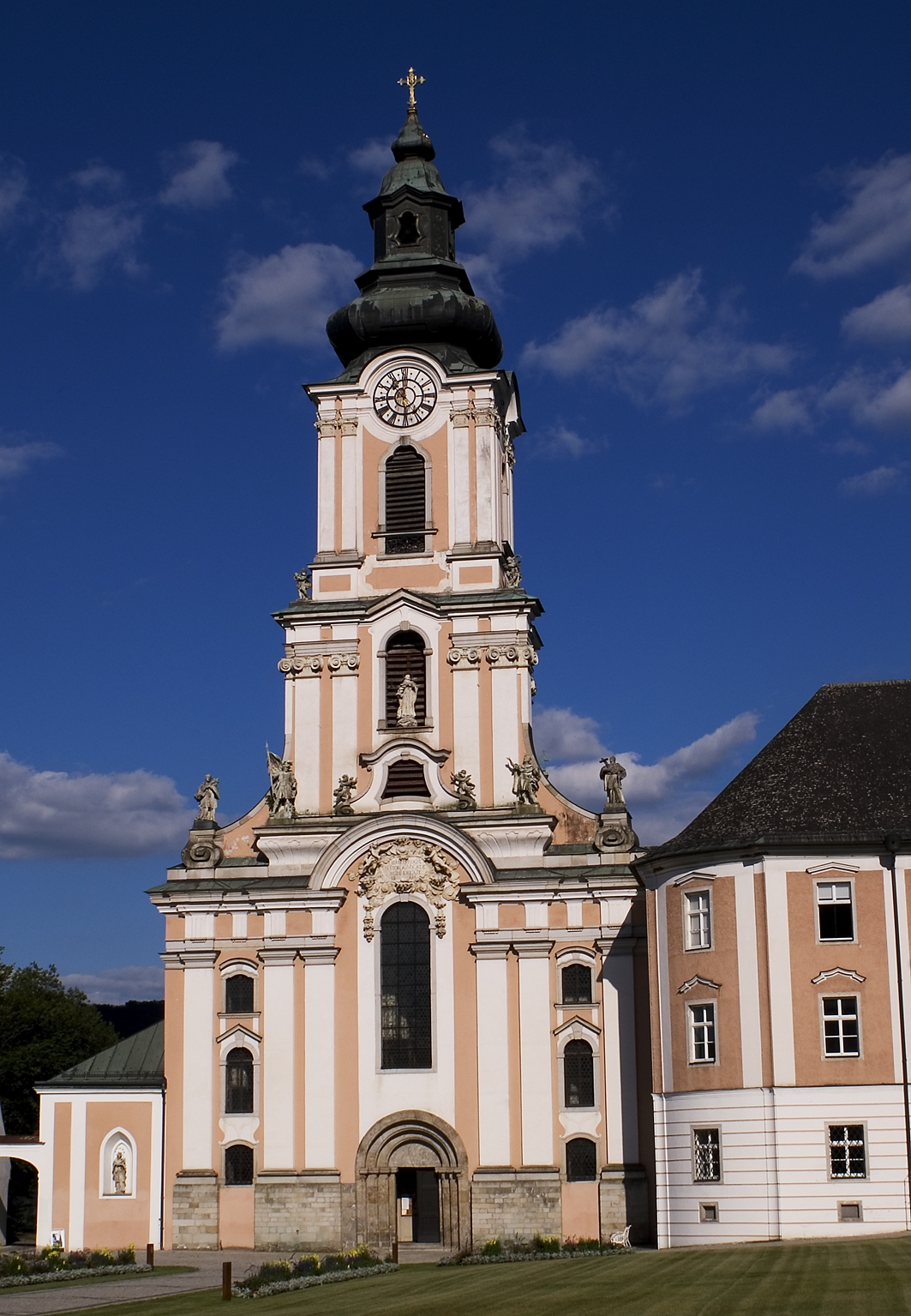
- Wilhering Abbey Church in Wilhering, Austria

- Location within Austria

Religion
- Affiliation: Catholic Church
- Ecclesiastical or organisational status: Monastery
- Year consecrated: 1146
- Status: Active

Location
- Location: Wilhering, Austria
- State: Upper Austria
- Coordinates: 48°19′26″N 14°11′25″E

Architecture
- Type: Abbey
- Style: Baroque, Rococo

Website
- www.stiftwilhering.at

Wilhering Abbey (German: Stift Wilhering) is a Cistercian monastery in Wilhering in Upper Austria, about 8 km (5 mi) from Linz. It was founded in 1146. The buildings, re-constructed in the 18th century, are known for their spectacular Rococo decoration.

== History ==
The monastery was founded by Ulrich and Kolo of Wilhering who donated their family's old castle for the purpose, in accordance with the wish of their deceased father after the family had moved to their new castle at Waxenberg in Oberneukirchen. It was settled initially by Augustinian Canons, but in the first years the new foundation was beset with problems. On 30 September 1146, Ulrich replaced the canons with Cistercian monks from Rein Abbey in Styria. Under its first abbot, Gerald, the monastery was richly endowed and placed under the protection of Eberhard, Bishop of Bamberg. After Ulric's death, his brother, Colo, completed the work so well begun.

The foundation did not flourish. In 1185, Henry, the fourth abbot, having but two monks, transferred the abbey to Burkhard, Abbot of Ebrach Abbey, the mother house of Rein, and the monastery was soon re-settled by monks from Ebrach. (Note: The decline was probably mostly caused by the harsh conditions of the site, but possibly also by the transfer of the patronage from the founders' family to the Schaunberg family.) Leopold VI, Duke of Austria, took it under his protection; monastic buildings replaced the old castle, donations enriched them, and many exemptions and privileges were granted by ecclesiastical and secular authorities, especially by Pope Innocent III, Pope Honorius III, and Emperor Frederick II. Wilhering later founded Hohenfurth Abbey, today known in Czech as Vyšší Brod Abbey (1258), Engelszell Abbey in Upper Austria (1295), and Säusenstein Abbey in Lower Austria (1334). In 1928, the monastery founded a daughter house at Apolo in Bolivia as part of a missionary initiative.

=== Reformation ===
The abbey almost came to an end during the Protestant Reformation, when Abbot Erasmus Mayer absconded with its funds to Nuremberg, where he married. By 1585, there were no monks left at the abbey, which was only saved by the efforts of Abbot Alexander a Lacu, who was installed by the emperor during the Counter-Reformation. He inaugurated reform in regular observance and temporal administration and regained possession of much of the monastery's former property; he also reconstructed the monastic buildings. At the end of his rule there were twenty priests, four clerics, and one brother in the community.

The abbey buildings were almost entirely destroyed by fire on 6 March 1733. (Note: The monastery was deliberately set on fire by a twelve-year-old girl egged on by an idle farmhand. ("Zisterzienserstift Wilhering", p. 27)) Abbot Johann Baptist Hinterhölzl (1734–1750) made emergency repairs to the church using the remnants of the walls.

=== Nineteenth century ===
Abbot Alois Dorfer served as abbot for more than forty years (1851–1892); he placed emphasis on the community's Cistercian heritage. He encouraged administrative structures akin to the medieval filiation system, in which each Cistercian abbey was attached to a mother abbey. Wilhering joined the Austrian Province for Cistercian abbeys when it was established in 1854. The novice masters began to teach young monks the Rule of St. Benedict and the value of ancient monastic observances. Still, most monks worked outside of the monastic enclosure as parish priests and teachers.

=== World War II ===
In 1940, Wilhering Abbey was expropriated by the Nazis, and the monks were expelled; some were arrested and sent to concentration camps, while others were forced into military service. The abbot, Bernhard Burgstaller, died of starvation in 1941 in Anrath Prison. Father Konrad Just was incarcerated in Dachau and Buchenwald from 1938 to 1945, yet survived. The buildings were used at first to accommodate the seminary from Linz. After 1944, displaced Germans from Bessarabia lived there; other parts served as a military hospital. In 1945, American troops took over the premises. The monks returned in the same year, resumed monastic life, and reopened the school.

Balduin Sulzer, Stiftskapellmeister at Wilhering, was a noted music educator and composer.

== Present day ==
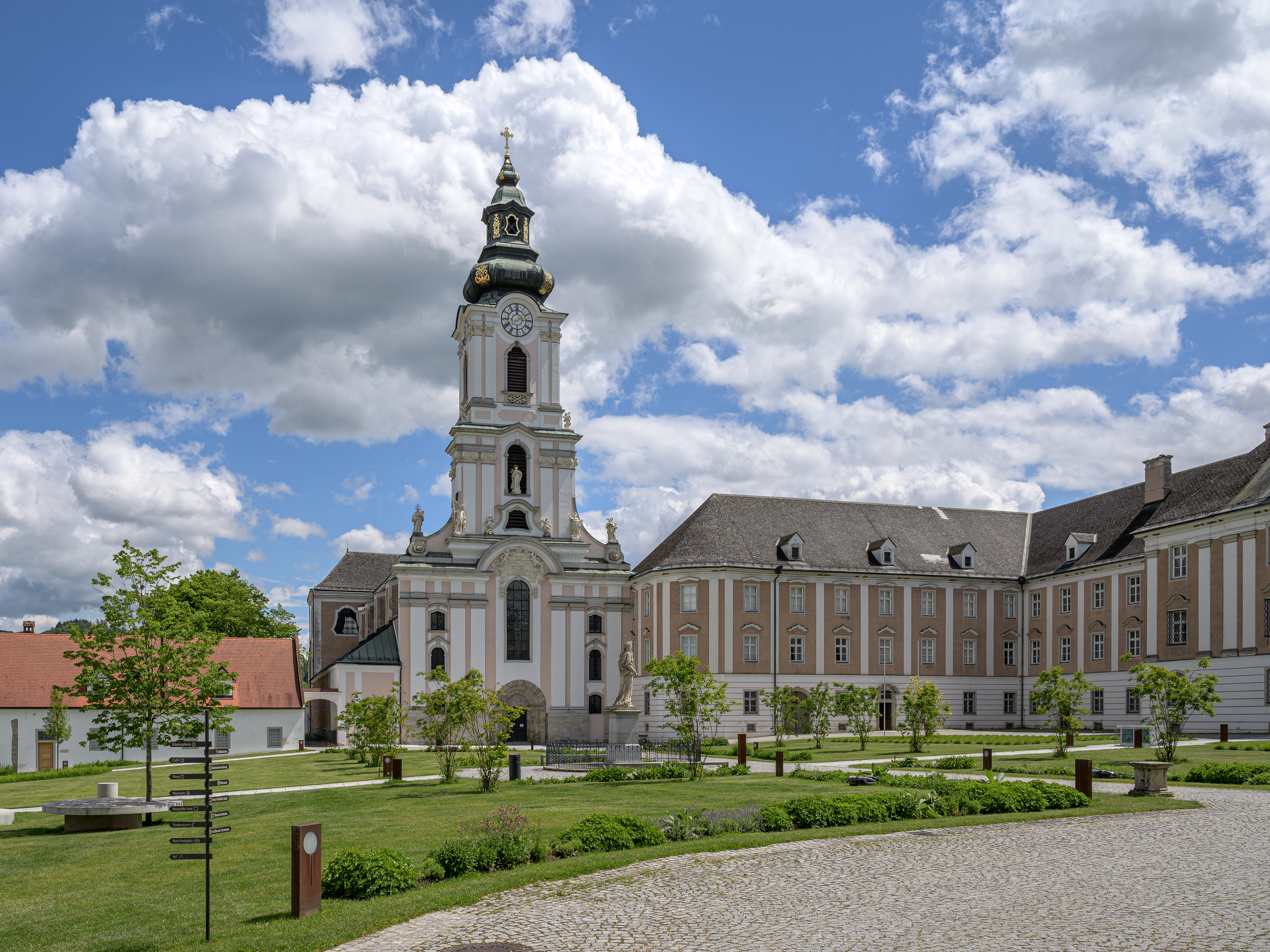
Wilhering Stiftskirche

As of 2007, the monastic community numbered 28. Today the abbey's business enterprises—mainly forestry, farming, and greenhouses—provide a sound economic basis for the monastery. (Note: In former times the site on the Danube furnished the abbey with additional revenues from fishing and ferry rights.) Kürnberg Forest (Kürnberger Wald), owned by the abbey and situated between Wilhering and Linz, forms a green belt that is highly beneficial to the people of the region. The forest contains the remains of a watchtower from the Roman period.

The Lady Chapel in the monastery's former chapter house in the cloister is now the place for the daily Liturgy of the Hours, which remains the center of monastic life for the small monastic community.

The monastery houses a museum, cafe, and museum store. Benedikt Hall is available for rental for functions. The new Guardian Angel Chapel, located in the entrance area of the collegiate church, was opened on May 14, 2023.

== School ==
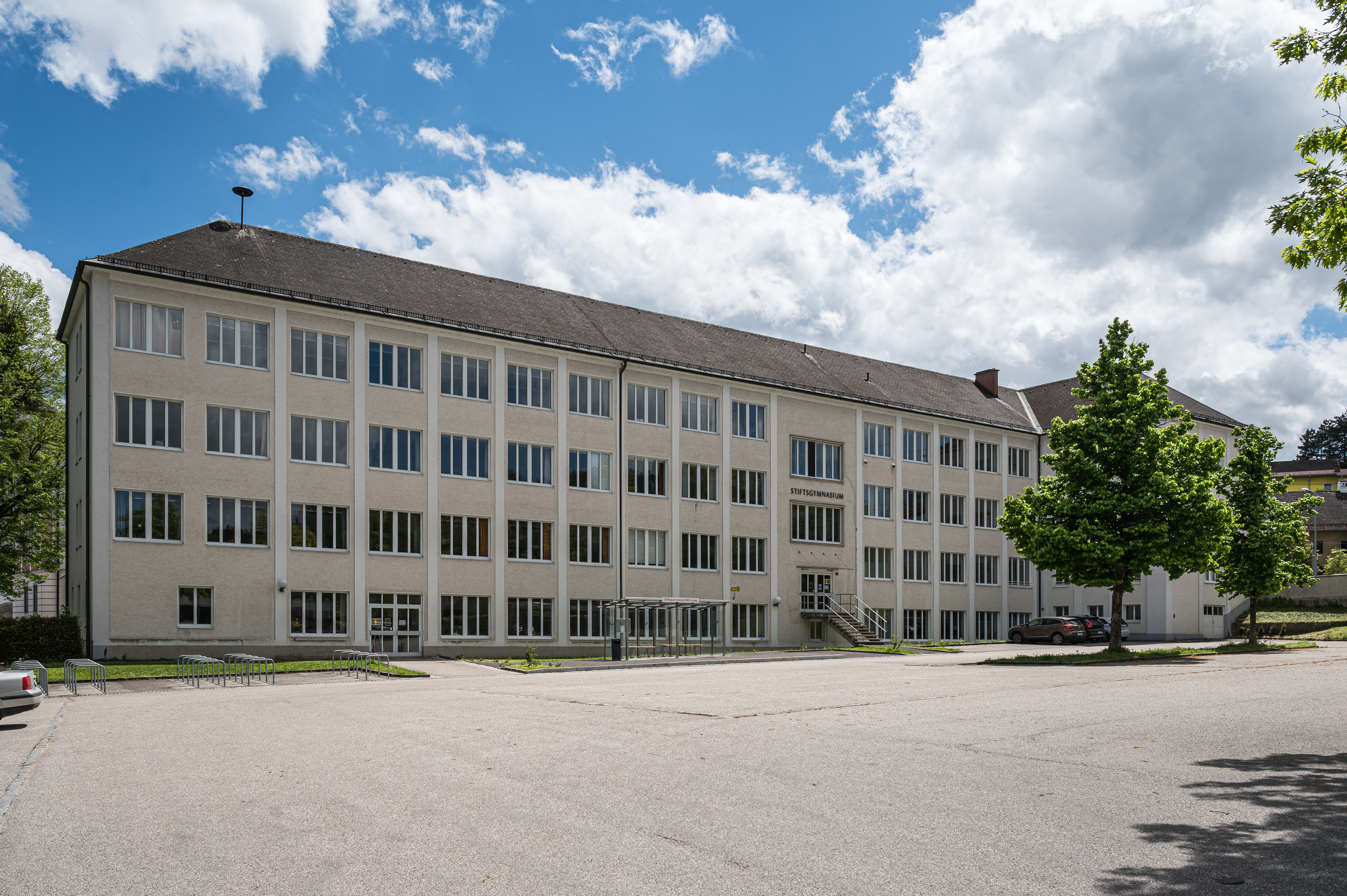
Wilhering Stiftsgymnasium

Under Abbot Theobald Grasböck in 1895, the abbey secondary school (Gymnasium) was founded with facilities for boarding. At first it consisted only of a private lower school. In the school year 1903/04 the school was granted permission to accept state pupils. From the school year 1917/18 upper forms were added, and the first Matura examinations were held in 1922. In 1938 the school and the boarding-house were suspended by the National Socialist régime. After the war the school was immediately re-established, and re-opened in the autumn of 1945. In 1956 a new boarding-house wing was constructed. The school buildings were entirely re-developed in 1963. Girls have been admitted since 1980/81. The facilities for boarding were discontinued at the end of the academic year in 1990. Presently the school offers general education to approximately 450 boys and girls.

== Buildings ==
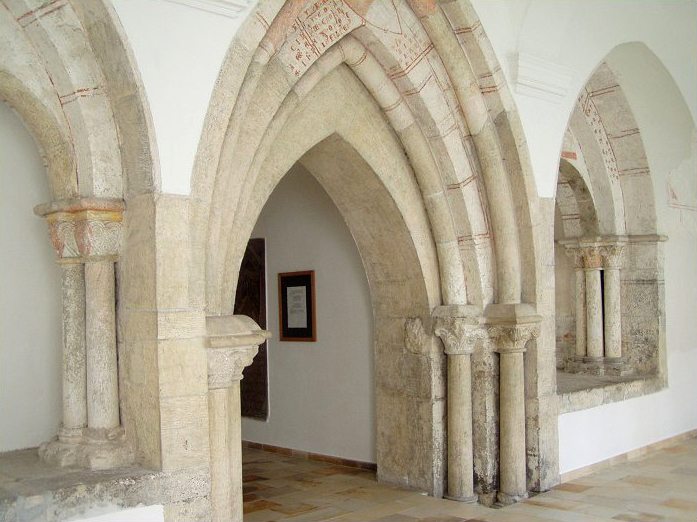
Gothic cloisters

The monastic buildings of the Cistercians were to be constructed, as closely as was possible, in the likeness of the mother house at Cîteaux. The entire monastery premises had to be surrounded by a wall. The main axis of the church had to be on an east–west line. The cloister, the "heart of the monastery", was to adjoin the southern front of the church. (Note: Unless, as with some sites, the geographical features were such that it had instead to adjoin the north front) The chapter house and the common room had to be placed in the east section of the cloister. Upstairs in the eastern range was the monks’ dormitory, connected by stairs with the church and the cloister. In the southern section of the cloister lay the monks’ refectory, and in front of it, projecting into the cloister, a pavilion with a washing-fountain, called the "fountain-chapel". The lay-brothers’ refectory and dormitory were placed in the western range of the cloister, and the kitchen in the south-western corner. The section of the cloister next to the church was used as a lecture-hall and had to be furnished with a pulpit. This ground plan was also retained in the Baroque layout of Wilhering Abbey. The prestigious buildings, however, which had been planned to surround the outer court of the abbey, were meant as extensions.

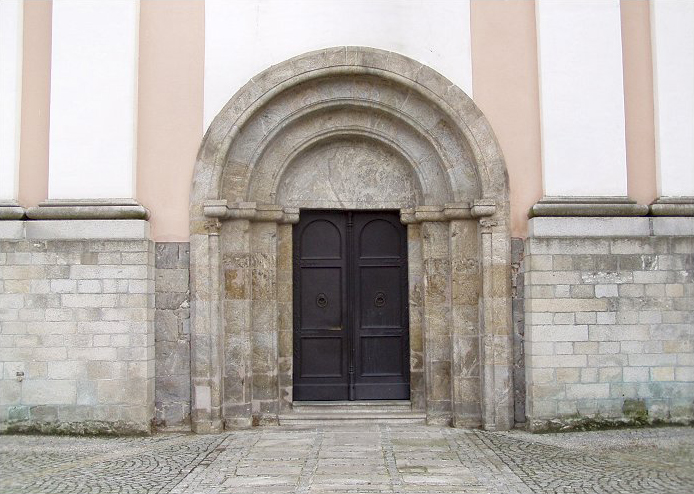
Romanesque portal from the old abbey church

Nothing remains of the original castle of Wilhering nor of any buildings erected by the monks of Rein. The monks of Ebrach, however, started the construction of a church in 1195 in the Romanesque style, repeatedly rebuilt in the following centuries. Of the previous buildings, only a Romanesque doorway, parts of the Gothic cloister and two tombs Gothic Schaunberg family tombs located on either side of the entrance by the western wall of the abbey church remain. The plain round-arched Romanesque portal of the former 12th-century church was integrated into the present Rococo church.

Originally, access to the church was forbidden to the public, in keeping with the wish of the Cistercians for seclusion. However, for the use of their tenantry they erected a special church, the so-called "people’s church", known from an old engraving in the cloister, which also shows the guesthouse by the road, the fish-pond, the gate-house with the monastery wall, and the garden with the mill. Today the fish-pond, the guesthouse and parts of the gate-house still remain. The guesthouse is considered one of the oldest parts of the monastery buildings. It was the abbey inn until 1970, and now houses a museum of modern art exhibiting works of the painter Fritz Fröhlich. Along with the former wine-cellars and the brewery, which ceased operation around 1930, it is now separated from the main building complex by a road.

The present abbey buildings comprise (a) the medieval nucleus (the church, the cloister and the quadrangular buildings of the convent), (b) the extensions from the Baroque period (the abbatial suite, the domed wing, the stables, barns and farm buildings), and (c) the new buildings of the school erected after World War II. To the west lies the abbey park, open to the public, with its stock of exotic trees and the Baroque pavilion. Further on are the greenhouses of the horticultural nursery which also belongs to the abbey.

The prominent attraction of the abbey's outer court is the west façade with the tower and, to the right, the abbatial suite. The tower was erected between 1735 and 1740 and consists of three storeys, which, due to their upward tapering, resemble an extended telescope. It is adorned with rich figural decorations.

== Abbey Church of the Assumption of Mary ==
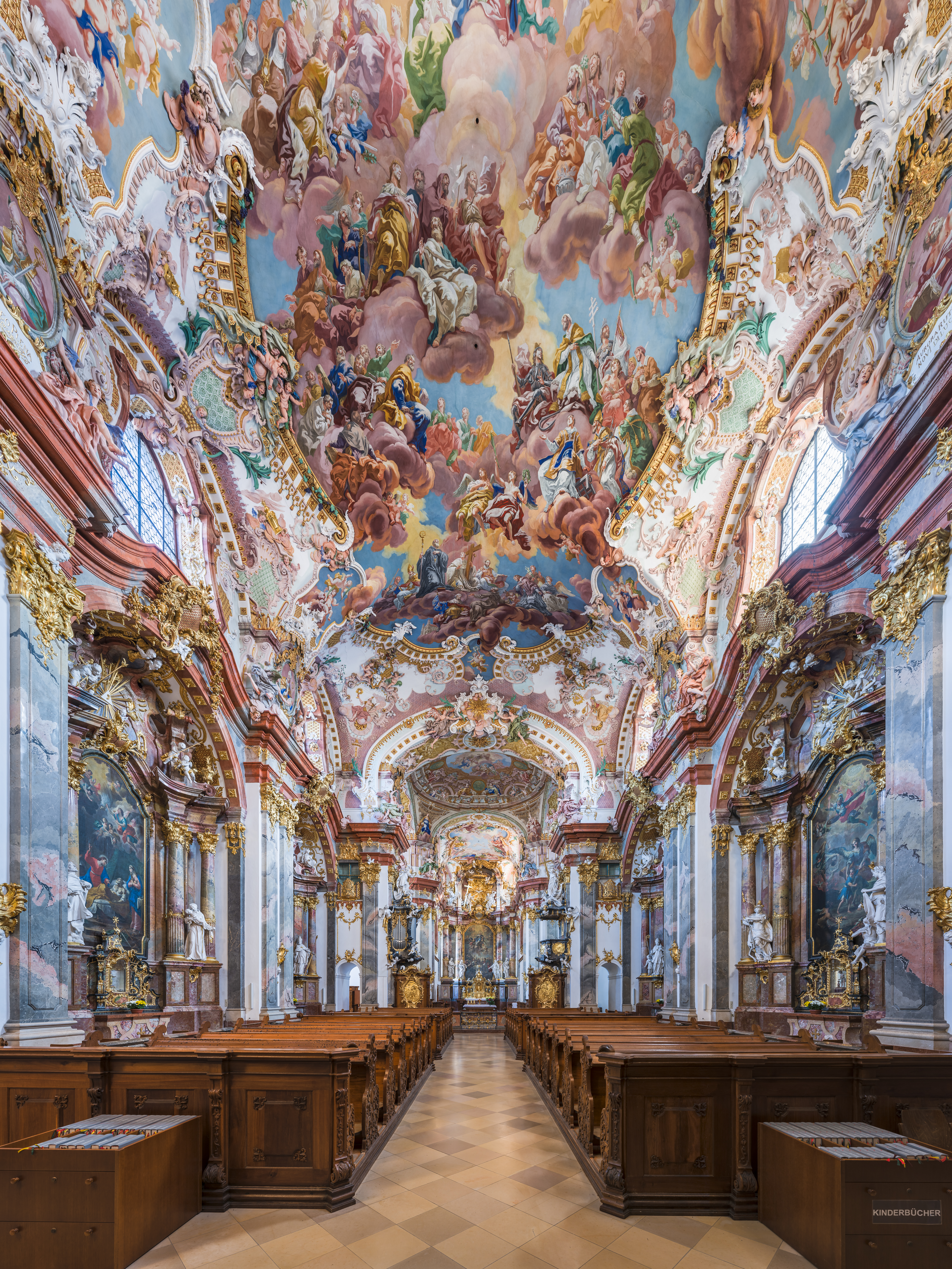
Abbey church interior

According to the German art historian Cornelius Gurlitt, "the abbey church of Wilhering is the most brilliant achievement of the Rococo style in the German-speaking world." It gives the impression that more decoration, colour, sculptures, paintings and stuccowork could not be found in a single place. The Baroque dream that heavenly light-heartedness and timeless happiness can be brought down to earth, a dream which in the Rococo period reached its nearly unrestrained climax, has come true at Wilhering. Moreover, all the individual elements are in harmony and seem to be connected in some way: the altars, the pulpit, the two organs, the choir stalls, the putti and the frescoes with numerous saints, with clouds and blue sky. These artists had a uniform feeling for style and taste.

The ground-plan of the present church is the same as that of the old church from before 1733. The church was completely rebuilt in the Rococo style by Johann Haslinger of Linz, a little-known master mason from Linz, who may have been working from designs by Joseph Matthias Abbot Hinterhölzl engaged various freelance artists to carry out the programme for the decoration, which is recorded in a banderol in the ceiling fresco of the chancel: "Assumpta est Maria in caelum, gaudent angeli". (Note: Latin; in English, "Mary is taken up to Heaven, the angels shout for joy")

The well-known Baroque painter Martino Altomonte, who was over eighty during this commission, created the altar-pieces. He also designed the high altar. The high altar-piece is dedicated to the Assumption of Mary. The two anterior altar-pieces, placed nearest to the high altar, refer to Mary's work in the Benedictine (left) and Cistercian (right) Orders. The pictures on the two middle altars show the death of Saint Joseph (left) and the guardian angel (right). Both altar-pieces at the back are dedicated to the Fourteen Holy Helpers (die Vierzehn Nothelfer): the holy virgins to the left and the intercessors for agriculture to the right. The paintings represent Late Baroque Italian Classicism.

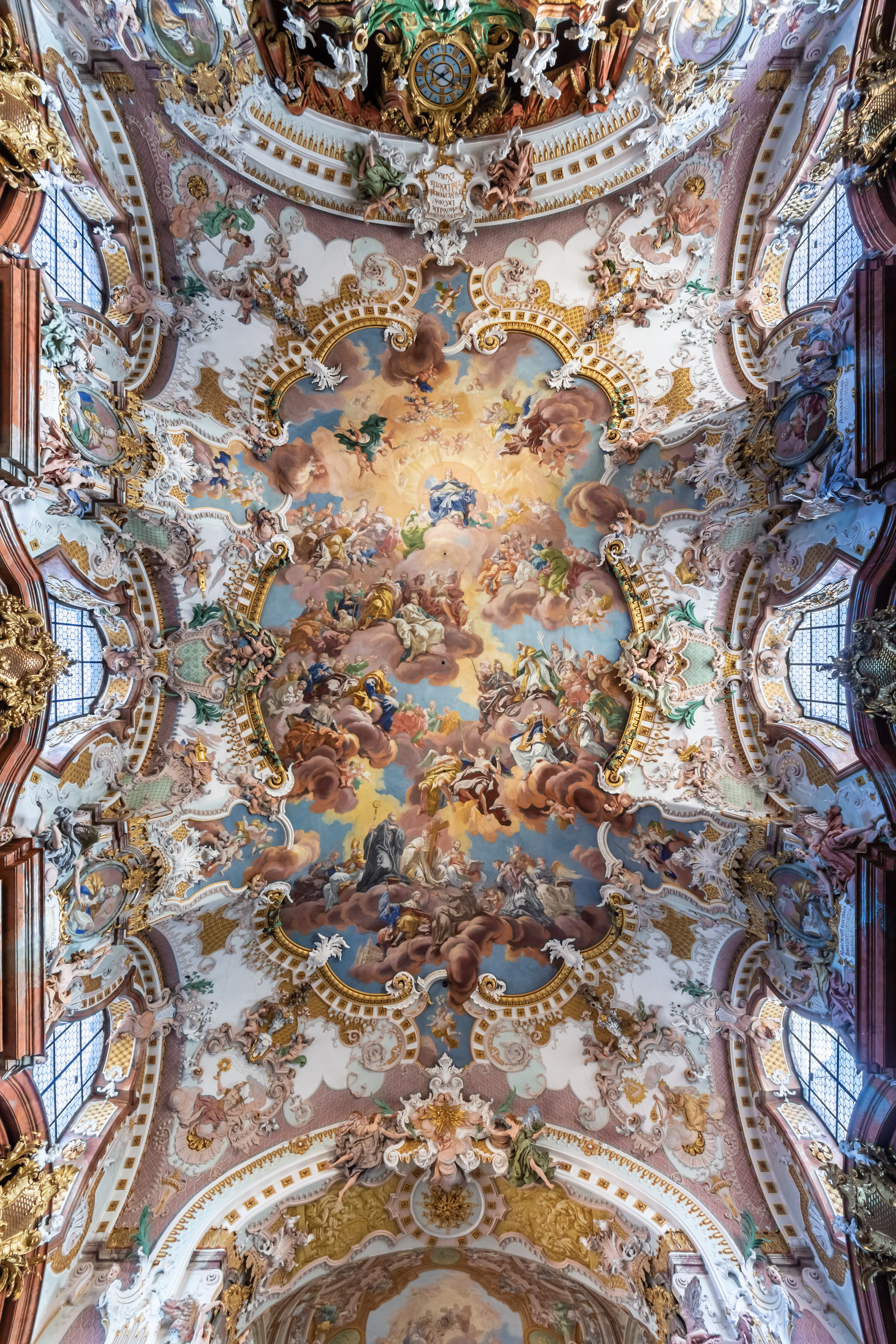
Ceiling frescoes by Bartolomeo Altomonte

The fresco painter was Martino Altomonte's son, Bartolomeo. He directed the greatest attention to frescoing the ceilings. In a way it was Bartolomeo's endeavour to create a perfect heavenly illusion, the desire to create a "new Heaven", according to Saint John's vision in the Book of Revelation. According to the abbot's wish, the frescoes had to be similar to those of the abbey at Spital am Pyhrn, showing Mary being assumed into the glory of Heaven. The angels, the whole world, and the saints of Heaven were to take part in Our Lady's triumph, assumption and coronation. Bartolomeo Altomonte succeeded in painting a fresco of more than 450 m2 (approximately 540 square yards). This extensive ceiling fresco is characteristic of the specific atmosphere in the church. The painting mainly shows saints related to the Cistercian Order, who are arranged in groups. The transition from fresco to plastic decoration is fluid. The richly gilded frames of stucco take up the liveliness of the picture and pass it on to the periphery of the vault. The transept shows frescoes praising the Virgin Mary in an allegorical manner. The idea is that grace will be heaped upon those who venerate Mary, and that all continents are united with her by the virtues of faith, hope, and charity.

The fresco in the flat cupola of the crossing is a combined work by the Italian painter of architectural perspective, Francesco Messenta, and Altomonte. The picture is an allegory of Mary's triumph over sin and the sinner's due punishment, symbolized by mankind chained to the globe. The frescoes in the presbytery and below the organ-loft show angels playing musical instruments in honour of the Queen of Heaven. The fresco in the Grundemann Chapel is complementary to the altar-piece of the chapel, whose subject is the wiping out of the original sin by Christ's redeeming blood. In the centre of the fresco there is the Christ Child being offered the instruments of Christ's Passion.

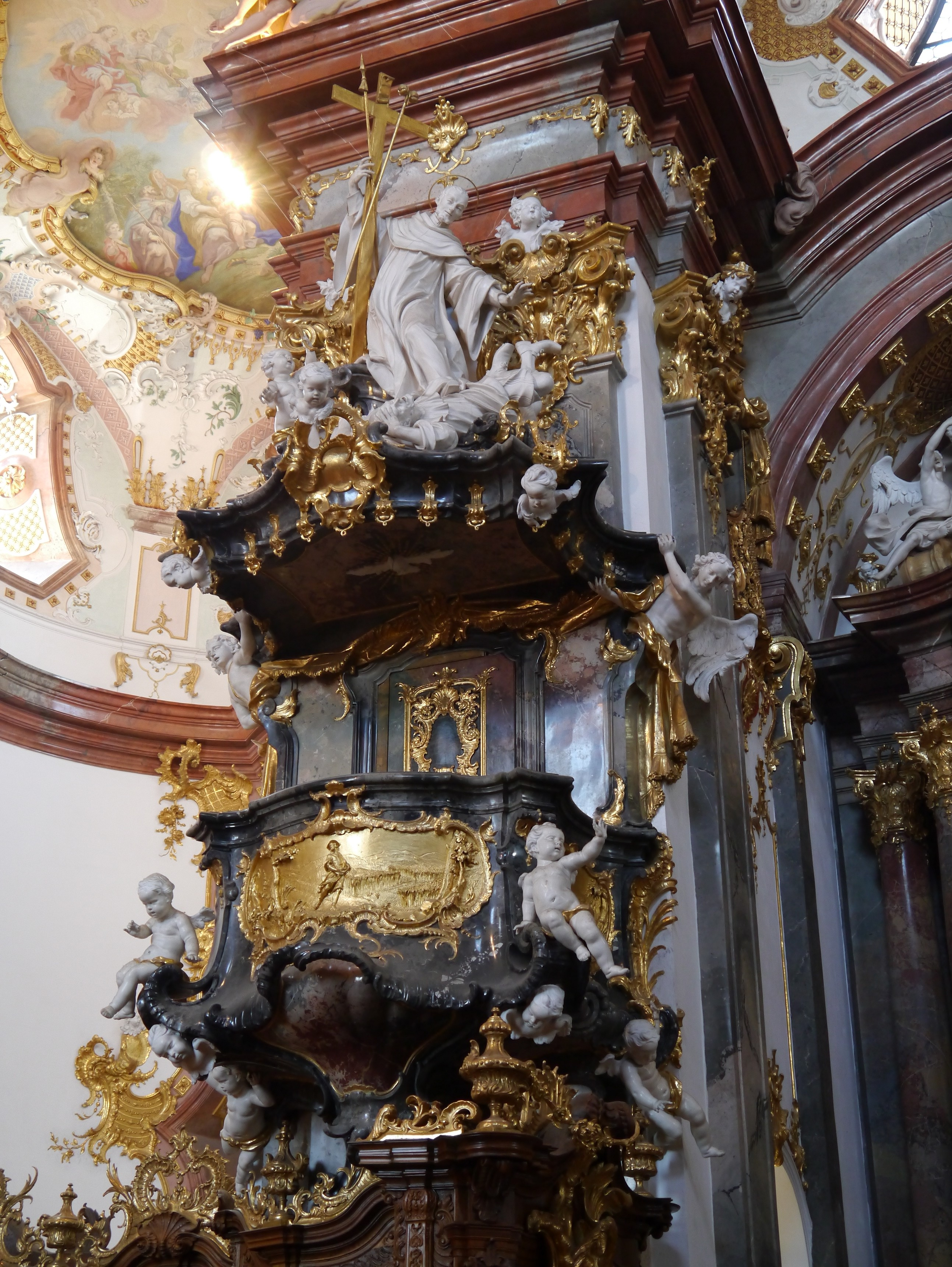
Pulpit decorated by Johann Michael Feichtmayr and Johann Georg Ueblherr

The Austrian stuccoer Franz Josef Holzinger of Sankt Florian was commissioned to do the stucco work (1739–1741). However, he was forced to interrupt his work by the War of the Austrian Succession, and his commission was later discontinued, as his stuccoing was too orderly with little exuberance. The work was continued by the Augsburg-born master stuccoers, Johann Michael Feuchtmayer and Johann Georg Ueblherr, two members of the Wessobrunner School. They applied the then highly admired and fashionable rocaille cartouche ornamentation, redecorated Holzinger's stuccoing with great skill, created the lively curved retables surrounding the large altar-pieces, and fashioned the pulpit as well as the casing of the choir organ. They also furnished the continuous main cornice with red stuccoed marble and all the pilasters with the same material in an elegant grey. Moreover, Ueblherr himself created the sixteen life-sized statues of saints for the altars, the figures of the Holy Trinity above the high altar, the statue of Saint Bernard of Clairvaux, the most famous abbot of the Cistercians, for the sounding-board of the pulpit, and the royal harpist David above the choir organ. It was also Feichtmayr and Ueblherr who placed the numerous glazed stucco putti and angels’ heads throughout the church.

They sent for the gilder Johann Georg Frueholz of Munich, who was known to them, to provide the final gloss to the interior of the church by gilding it abundantly. In the meantime two lay-brothers of Wilhering, Eugen Dymge and Johann Baptist Zell, carved the choir stalls and the pews.

The choir organ, a counterpart of the pulpit, was made in 1746 by Nikolaus Rumel the elder. The famous Austrian composer Anton Bruckner counted it among his favourites. The main organ, with its Baroque casing, is the decorative highlight at the back of the church. It was made in 1883 by Leopold Breinbauer and now has thirty-eight stops.

The essential work of decorating and furnishing was completed in 1748. At that time the monastery's debts amounted to 122,000 florins, a sum equivalent to the value of 10,000 cows. The result is now one of the most significant Rococo buildings in the German-speaking world.

The latest overall restoration of the church took place between 1971 and 1977 under the artistic direction of Prof. Fritz Fröhlich.

== Gallery ==
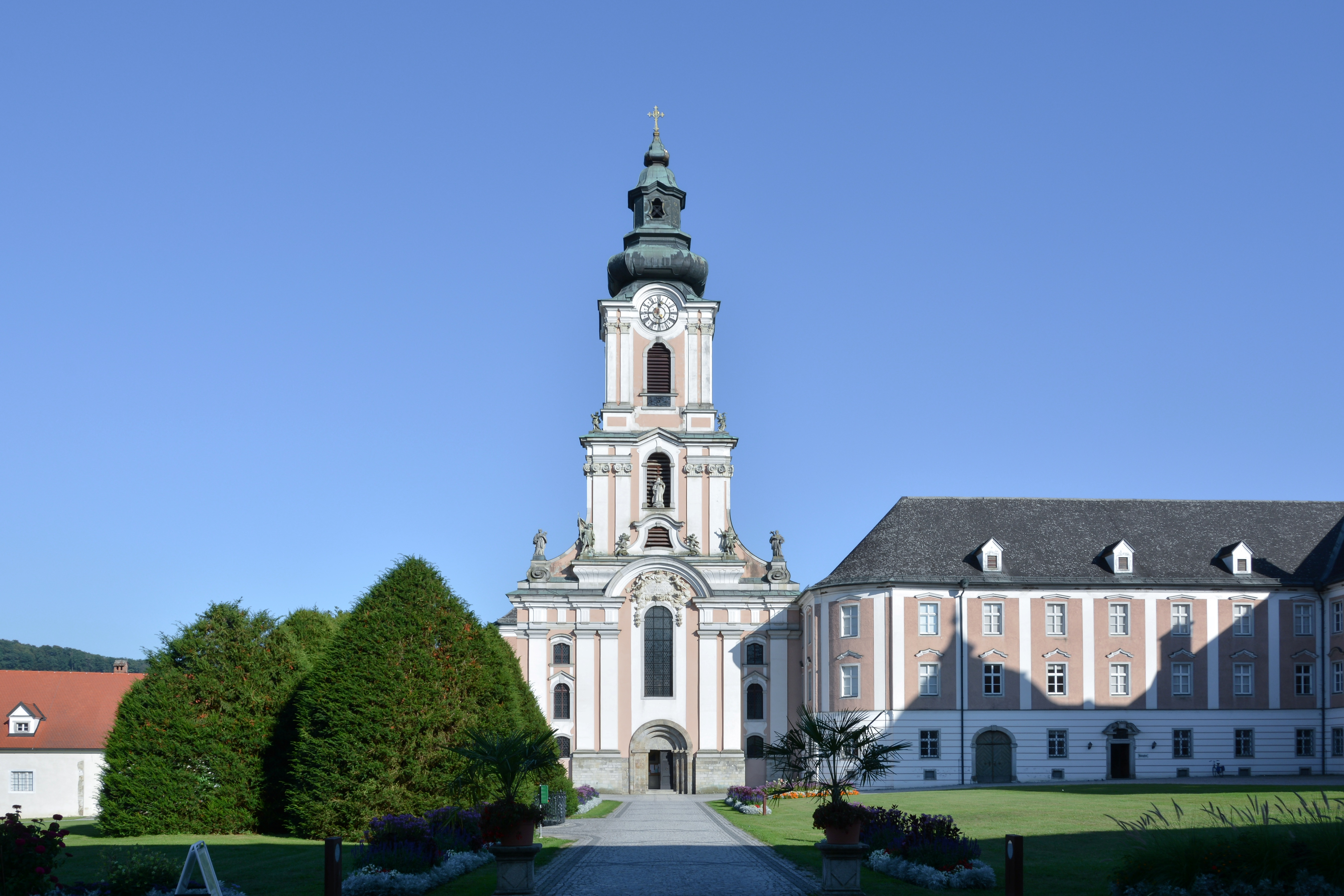
Monastery grounds

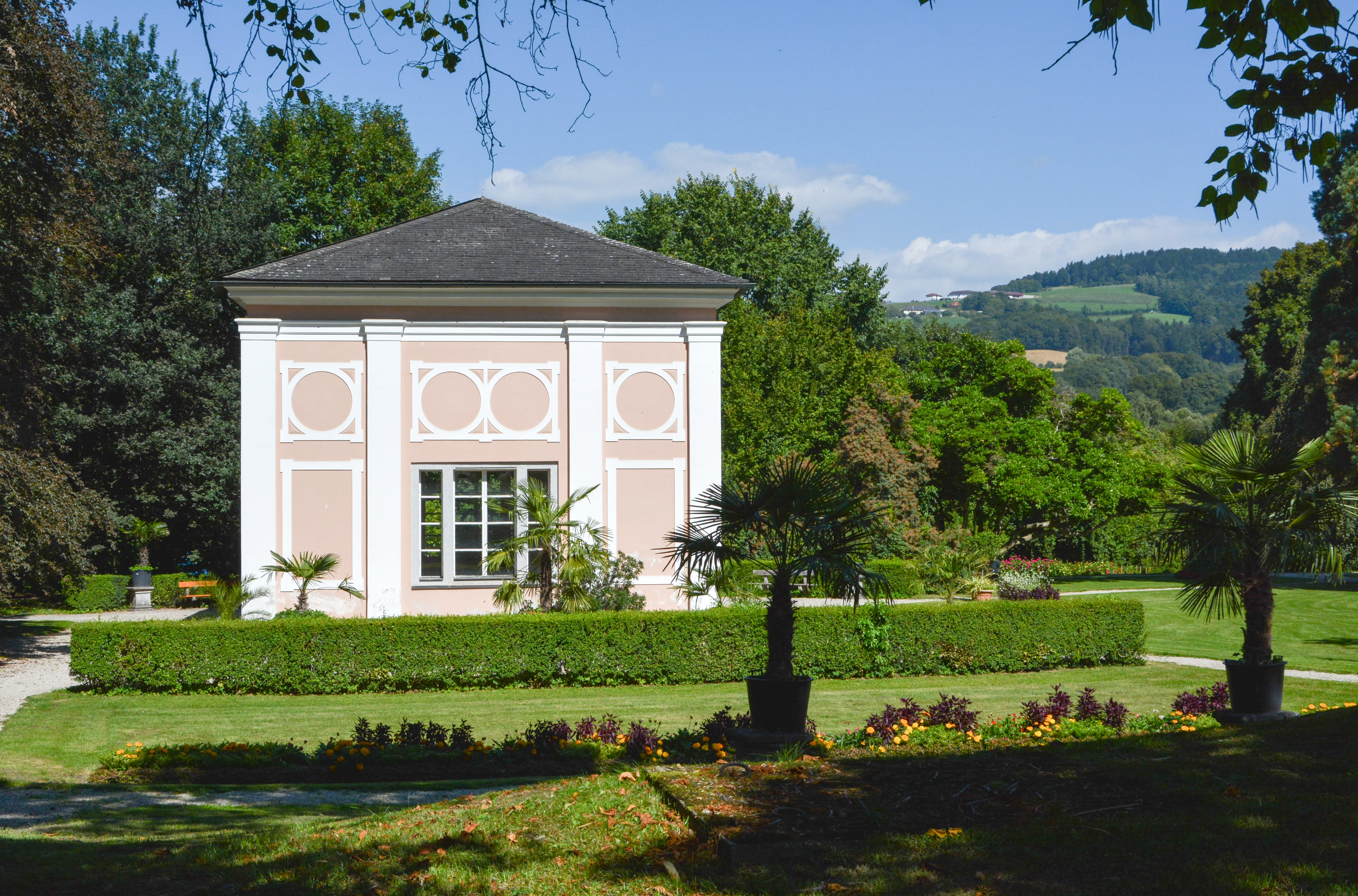
Garden pavilion

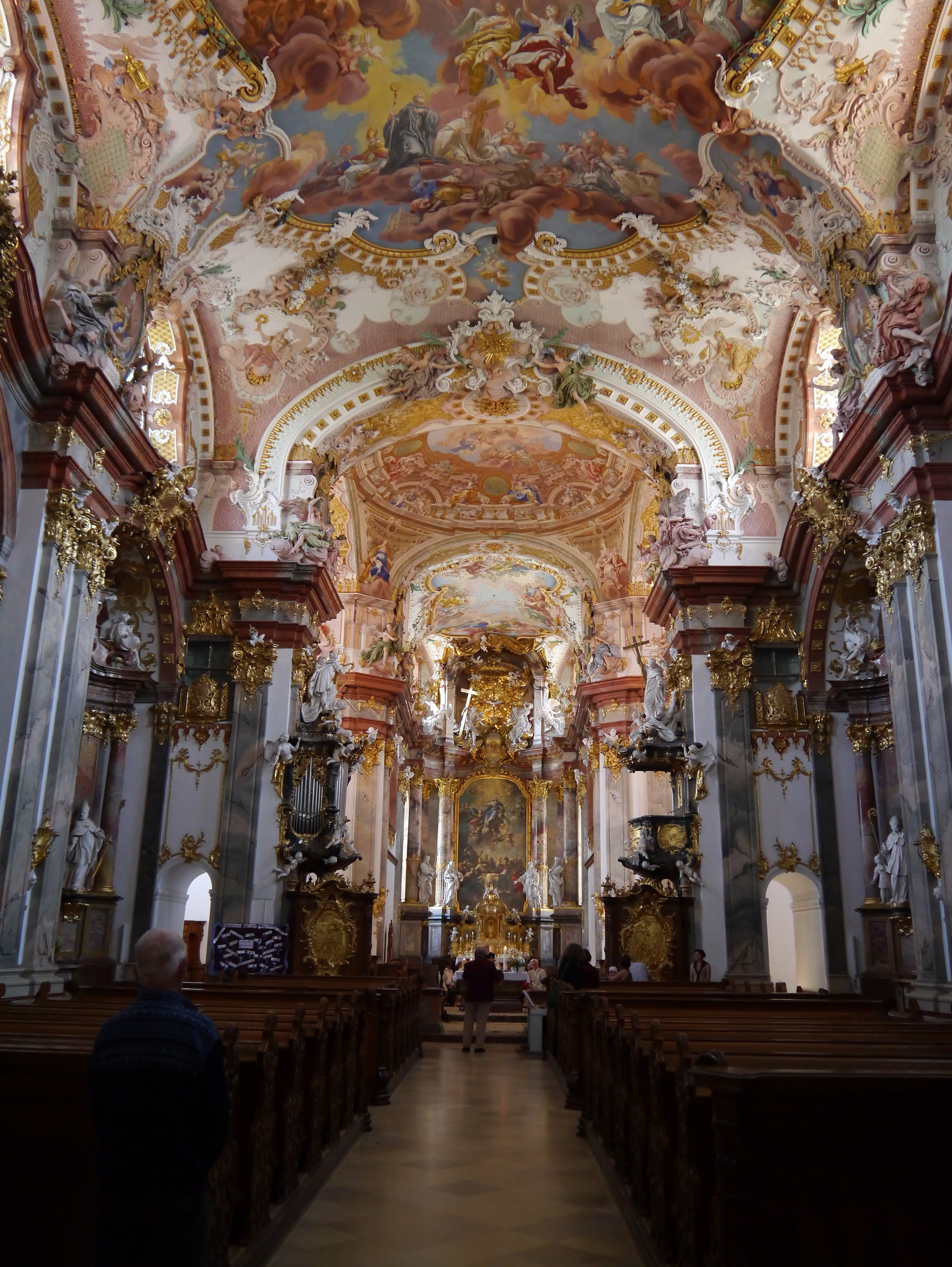
Abbey church interior

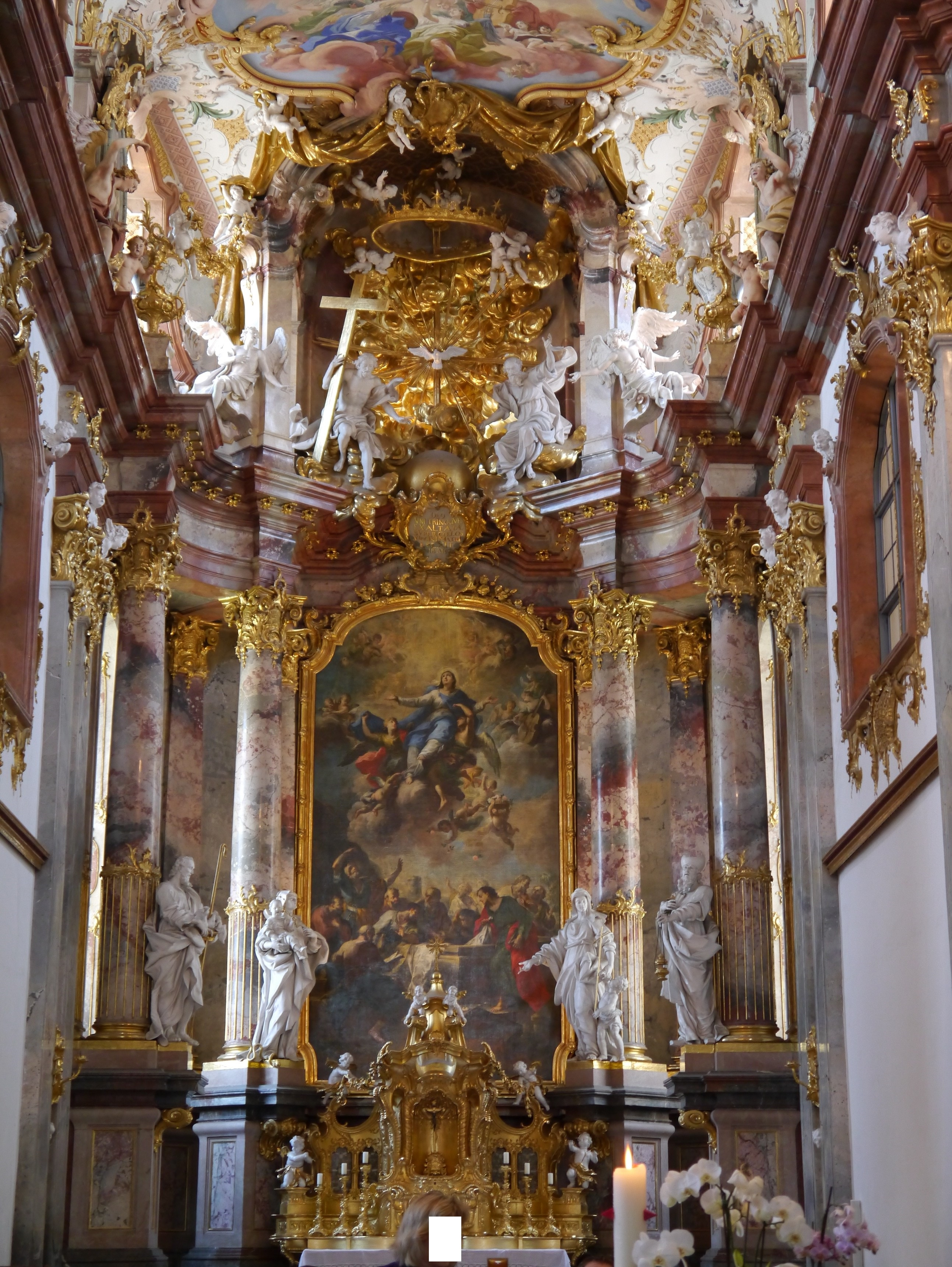
Abbey church high altar

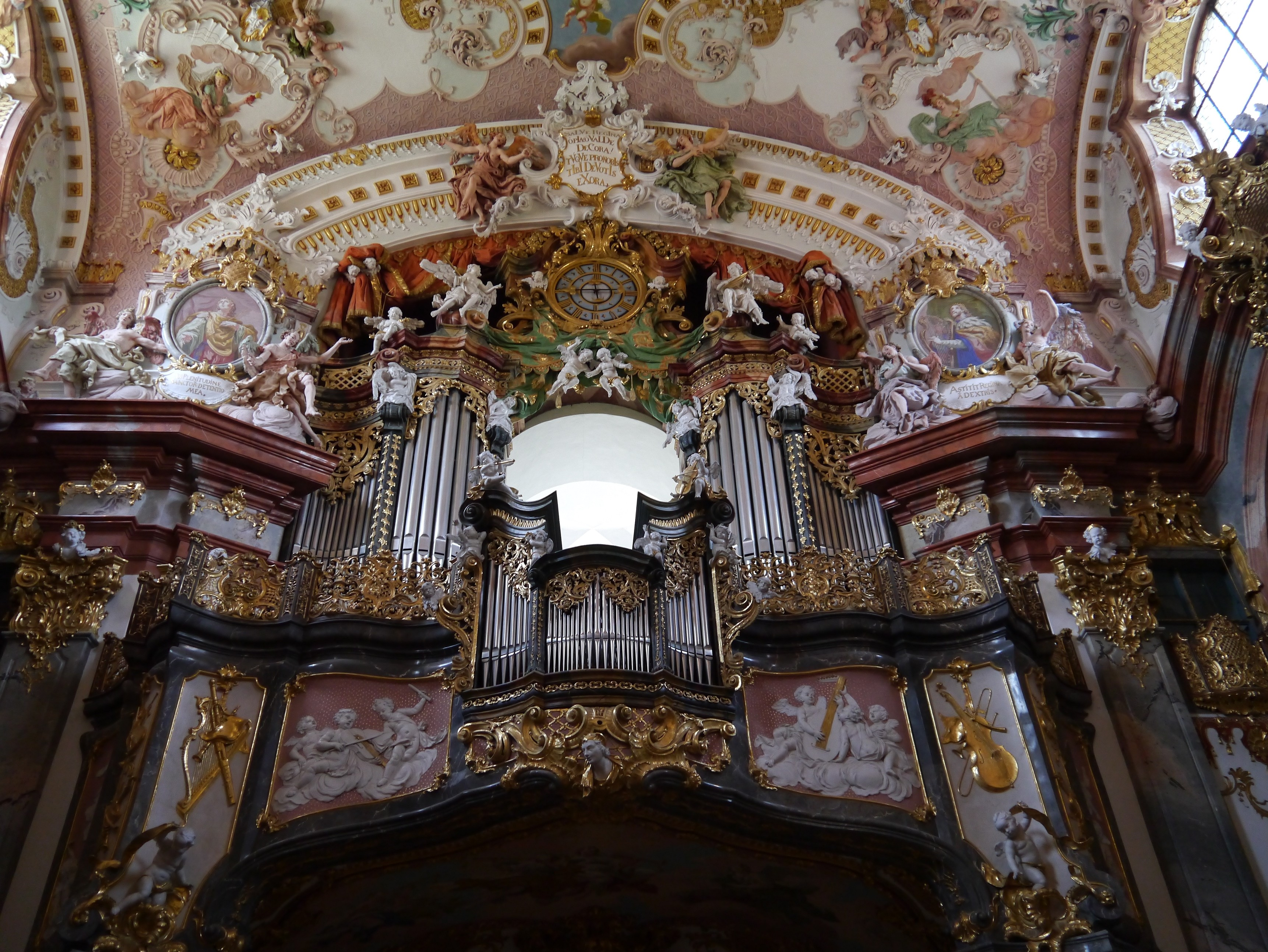
Abbey church organ

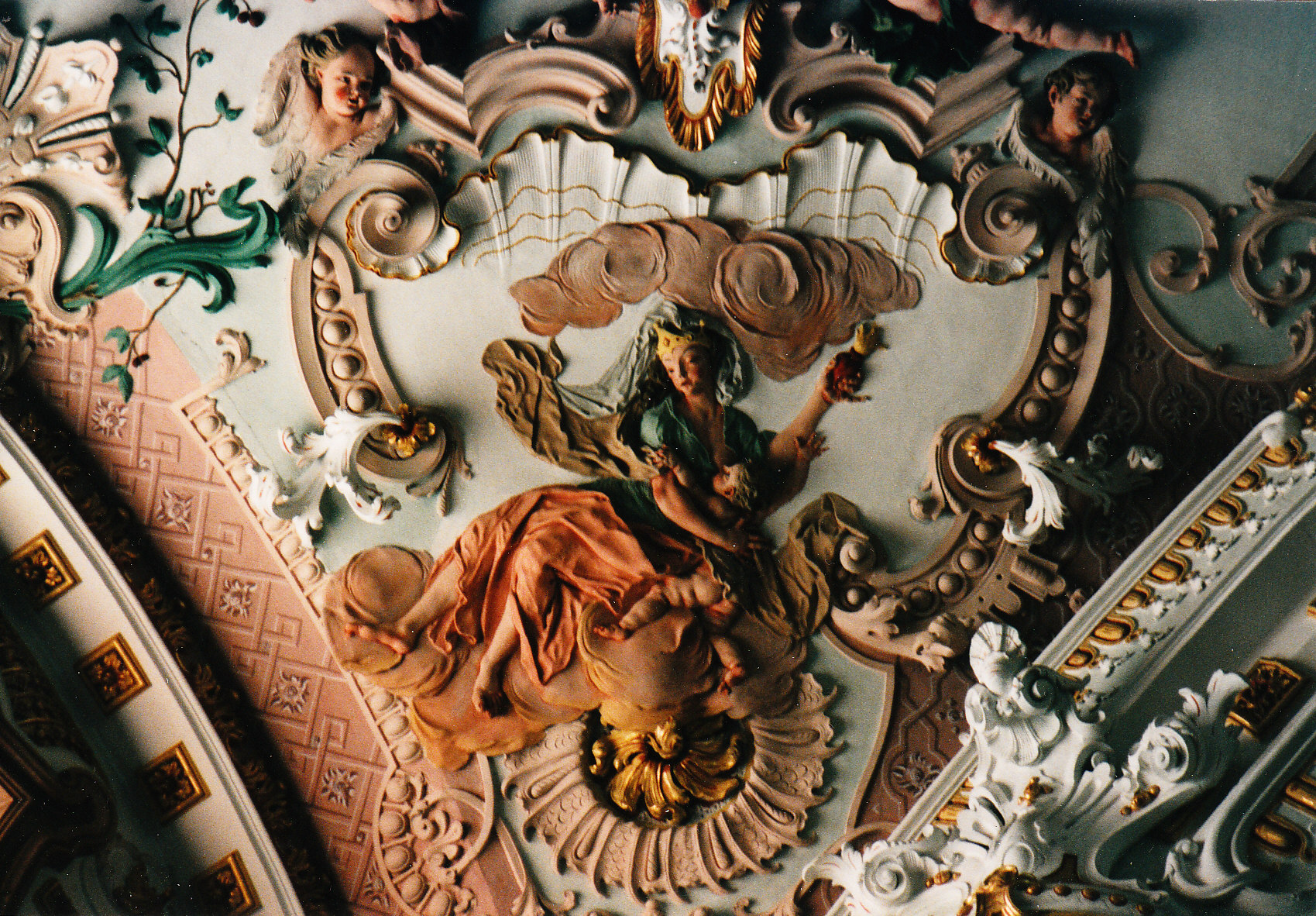
Stucco relief

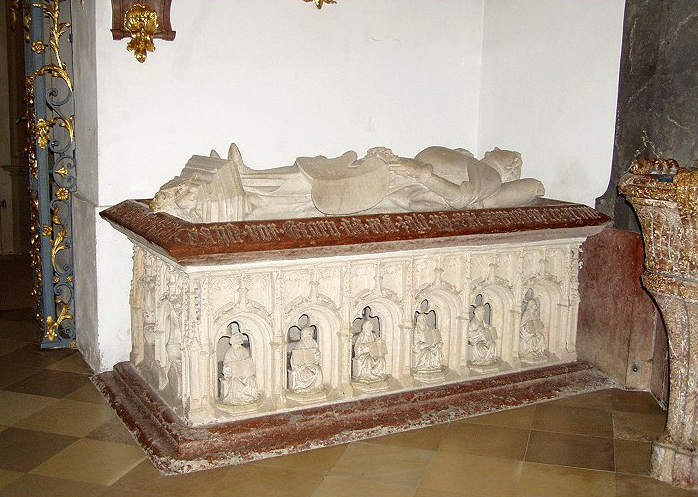
One of the Schaunberg tombs

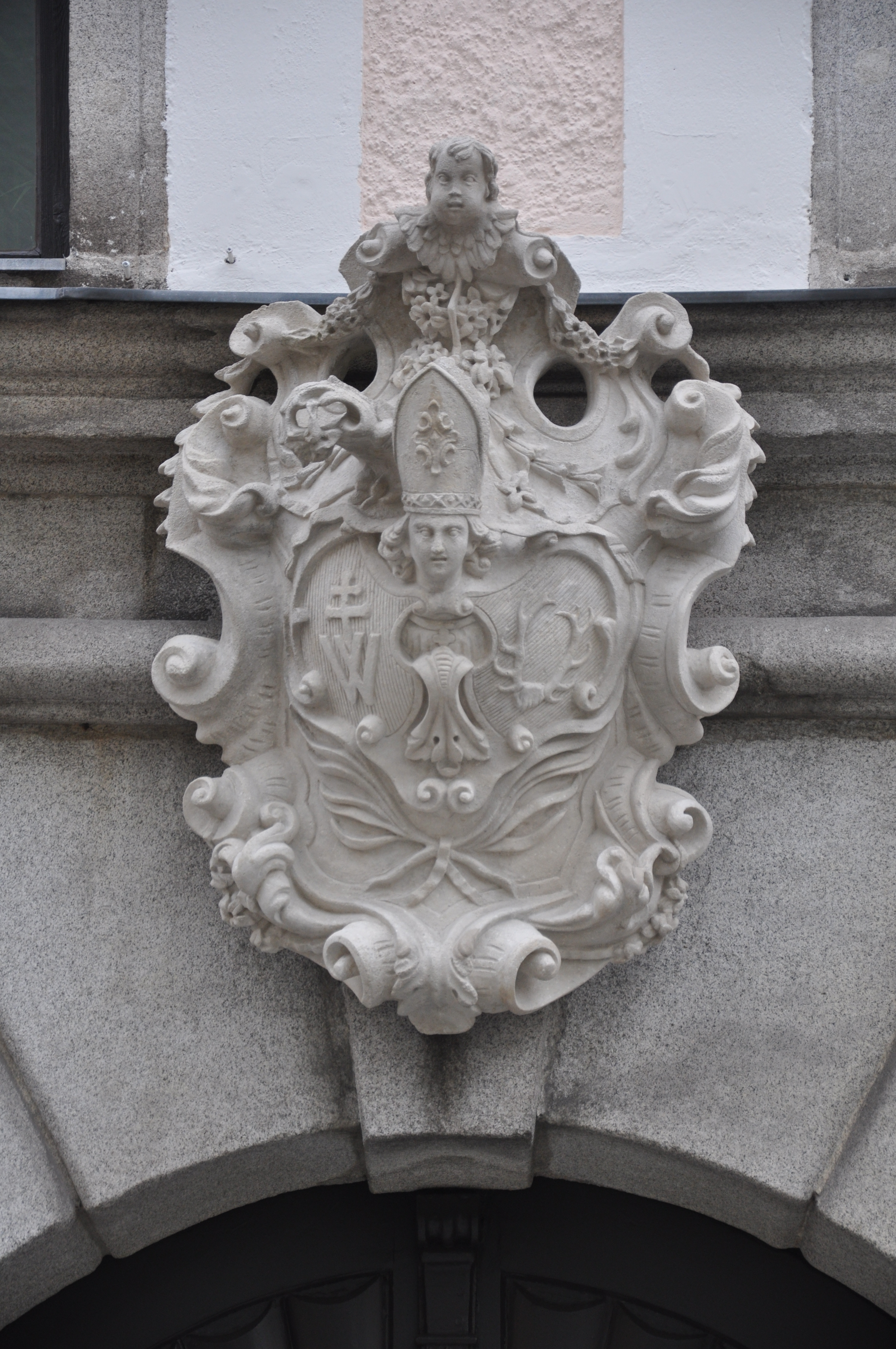
Coat of arms above the portal

== List of abbots ==
1. Gebhard I (1146–1155)
2. Gebhard II (1155–1180)
3. Otto I (1180–1181)
4. Heinrich I (1181–1185)
5. Heinrich II (1185–1186)
6. Hiltger (1186–1193)
7. Otto II von Niest (1193–1201)
8. Gottschalk (1201–1208)
9. Eberhard (1208–1215)
10. Konrad I (1215–1234)
11. Theodorich (1234–1241)
12. Konrad II (1241–1243)
13. Heinrich III (1243–1246)
14. Ernest (1246–1270)
15. Ortolf (1270–1273)
16. Pitrof (1273–1276)
17. Hugo (1276–1280)
18. Wolfram (1281–1288)
19. Konrad III (1288–1308)
20. Ulrich I (1308–1309)
21. Otto III (1309)
22. Wisento (1309–1313)
23. Stephan I (1313–1316)
24. Heinrich IV Praendl (1316–1331)
25. Konrad IV (1331–1333)
26. Hermann (1333–1350)
27. Bernhard I Hirnbrech (1350–1359)
28. Simon (1359–1360)
29. Walther (Balthasar) (1360–1366)
30. Andreas (1366–1369)
31. Johann I (1370–1381)
32. Peter I (1381–1385)
33. Jakob I (1385–1421)
34. Stephan II (1421–1432)
35. Ulrich II (1432–1451)
36. Georg I (1451–1452)
37. Ulrich III (1452–1460)
38. Wilhelm (1460–1466)
39. Conrad V Panstorfer (1467–1470)
40. Urban (1470–1480)
41. Thomas Dienstl (1480–1507)
42. Caspar I (1507–1518)
43. Leonhard Rosenberger (1518–1534)
44. Peter II Rinkhammer (1534–1543)
45. Erasmus Mayer (1543–1544)
46. Martin Gottfried (1545–1560)
47. Matthaeus Schweitzer (1568–1574)
48. Johann II Hammerschmied (1574–1583)
49. Jakob II Gistl (1584–1587)
50. Alexander a Lacu (1587–1600)
51. Johann Schiller (1603–1611)
52. Anton Wolfradt (1612–1613)
53. Georg II Grill (1614–1638)
54. Capar II Orlacher (1638–1669)
55. Malachias Braunmüller (1670–1680)
56. Bernhard II Weidner (1681–1709)
57. Hilarius Sigmund (1709–1730)
58. Bonus Pemerl (1730–1734)
59. Johann IV Baptist Hinterhölzl (1734–1750)
60. Raimund Schedelberger (1750–1753)
61. Alan Aichinger (1753–1780)
62. Johann V Baptist Hinterhölzl (1781–1801)
63. Bruno Detterle (1801–1832)
64. Johann VI Baptist Schober (1832–1850)
65. Alois Dorfer (1851–1892)
66. Theobald Grasböck (1892–1915)
67. Gabriel Fazeny (1915–1938)
68. Bernhard Burgstaller (1938–1941)
69. Balduin Wiesmayer (1941–1948)
70. Wilhelm Ratzenböck (1948–1965)
71. Gabriel Weinberger (1965–1977)
72. Dominik Nimmervoll (1977–1991)
73. Gottfried Hemmelmayr (1991–present)
74. Reinhold Dessl (administrator from 2012)

== Sources ==
- Guby, Rudolf, 1920: Das Zisterzienserstift Wilhering in Oberösterreich. Österreichische Kunstführer, vol. 4. Vienna
- Lekai, Louis J. (1977). The Cistercians, Ideals and Reality. Dallas: The Kent University Press. ISBN 0873382013.
- Reisinger, Amadeus [in German] (1939). Stift Wilhering an der Donau [Wilhering Abbey on the Danube]. Munich: Schnell & Steiner. OCLC 1178878793.
- Zisterzienserstift Wilhering (ed.), 1983: Wilhering, Stift und Kirche. Wilhering
