= Martino Altomonte =

Italian painter

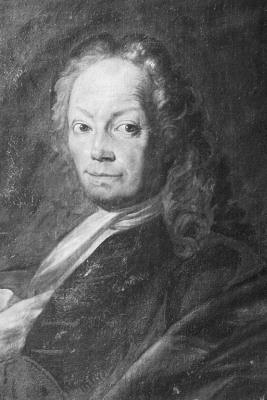
Martino Altomonte

Martino Altomonte, born Johann Martin Hohenberg (8 May 1657 – 14 September 1745) was an Italian Baroque painter of Austrian descent who mainly worked in Poland and Austria.

== Life and work ==
Martino Altomonte (Johann Martin Hohenberg) was born in Naples to a family of painters. Hohenberg's father was born in the Tyrol and emigrated to Naples. At the age of 15, he was apprenticed to Giovanni Battista Gaulli in Rome. Later he trained under the guidance of Carlo Maratti.

In 1684, Hohenberg became the court painter of John III Sobieski, king of Poland, and changed his name to Altomonte upon the occasion. During his stay in Warsaw, he mostly painted battle pieces (for example, the Siege of Vienna) and royal portraits. He also produced many altarpieces, most of which did not survive. One that was not destroyed, the Sacrifice of Abraham (now Tarnów, Diocese Museum), shows Altomonte as "a follower of Neapolitan chiaroscuro painting". His son Bartolomeo Altomonte, also a painter, was born in 1694.

Altomonte moved to Vienna c.1699–1702, where he remained for the rest of his life, creating many frescoes and altarpieces. In 1707, he was appointed a teaching member of the Akademie der Bildenden Künste, which probably led to the commission to decorate the Neue Favorita, an annexe of Schloss Augarten.

The oil paintings executed during that period and that came down to us indicate that Altomonte developed his own style based on the mixture of Neapolitan and Venetian styles of painting, thus initiating Viennese Baroque painting. His style of oil painting "scattered Venetian pastel tones among dramatic elements of Neapolitan chiaroscuro."

In 1709–1710, he worked on ceiling paintings for the archbishop's Residenz at Salzburg. He later executed altar paintings in Vienna for the Dorotheerkirche (1713; now in Rheindorfer Parish Church), the Peterskirche and the Stephansdom (both 1714) and for the parish church in Krems and the Deutschordenskirche in Laibach (now Ljubljana, Slovenia; both 1715). In 1716 he painted the ceiling frescoes in the Lower Belvedere in Vienna.

== Gallery ==
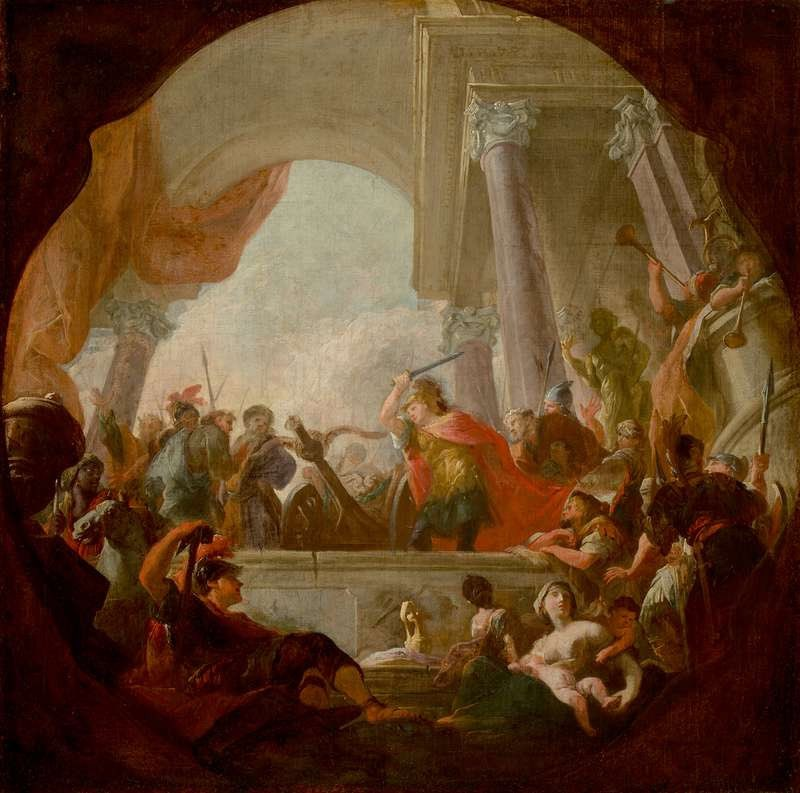
Alexander Cutting the Gordian Knot (1708)

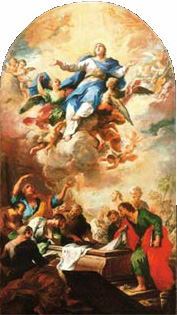
The Ascension of Mary (1737), high altarpiece at the Stiftskirche Wilhering

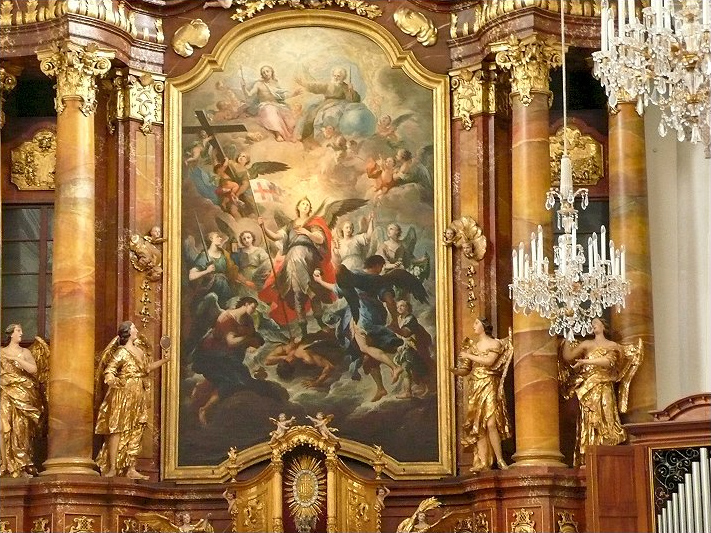
High altarpiece (1738–40) of the Ursuline church dedicated to St. Michael in Linz

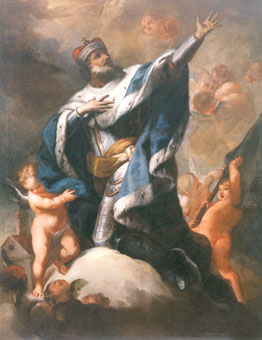
The Apotheosis of St. Leopold (ca. 1750)

== Sources ==
- Felix Czeike (1992) Historisches Lexikon Wien, Volume I, ISBN 3-218-00546-9
- Hannes Etzlstorfer (2002) Martino und Bartolomeo Altomonte. Baroque museum, Salzburg ISBN 3-901925-27-9.
- Hans Aurenhammer (1965) Martino Altomonte. Herold, Vienna
