= Seitenstetten Abbey =

Benedictine monastery in Austria

Coordinates: 48°02′06″N 14°39′15″E

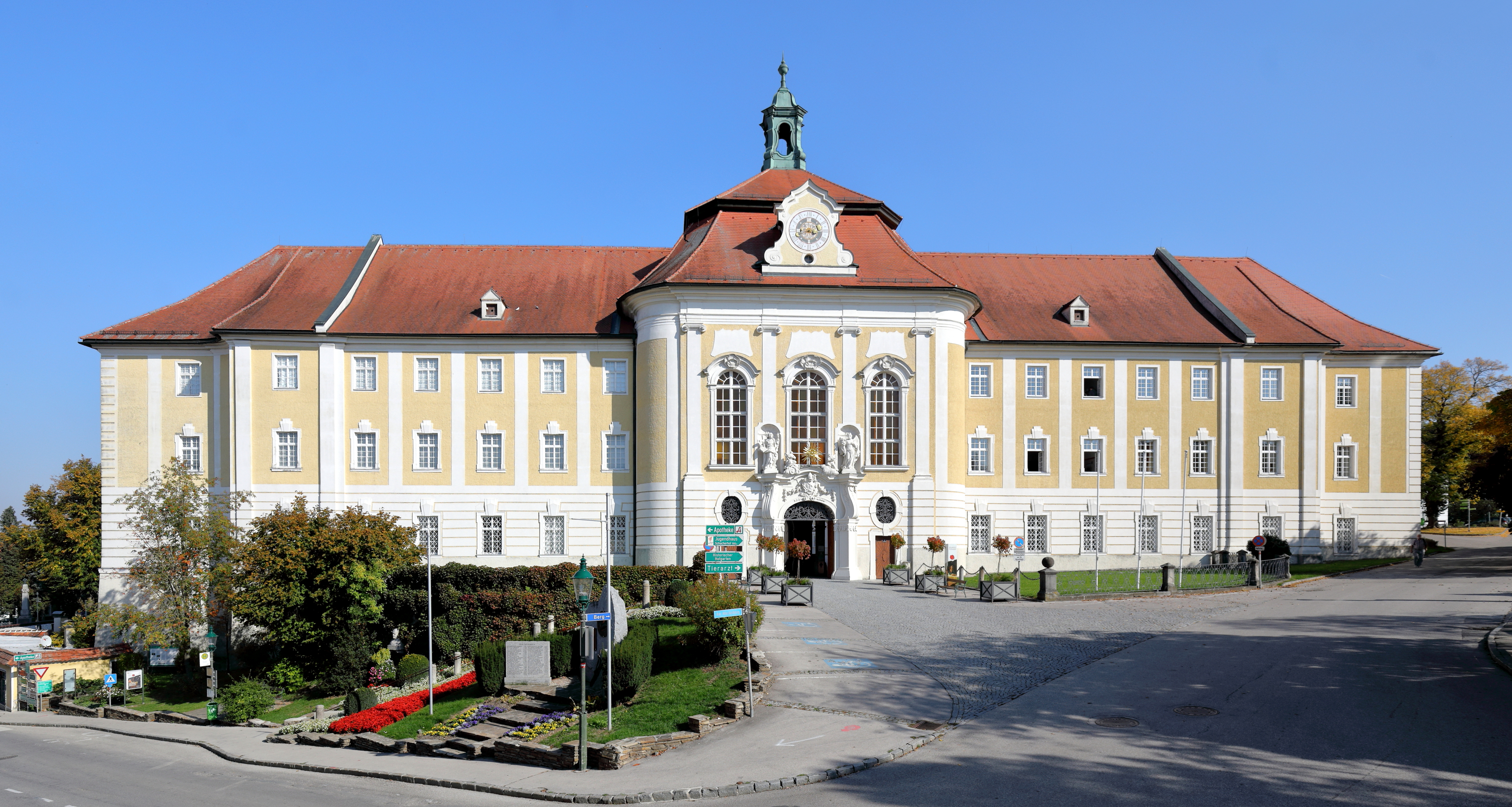
Seitenstetten Abbey in Lower Austria

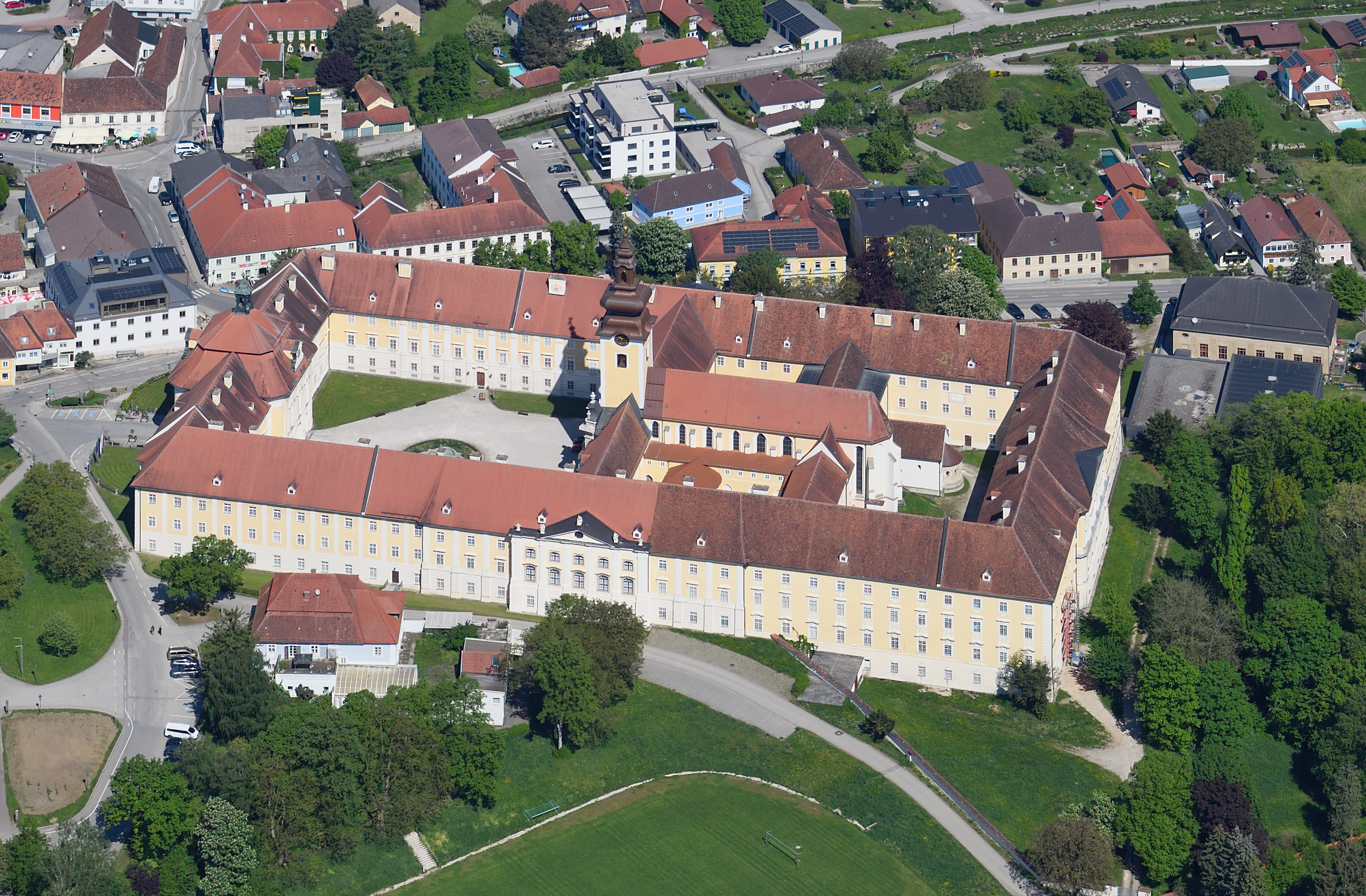
Aerial view

Seitenstetten Abbey (German: Stift Seitenstetten) is a Benedictine monastery in Seitenstetten in the Mostviertel region of Lower Austria.

== History ==
The monastery was founded in 1112 by Udalschalk, or Udiskalk, a relative of Bishop Ulrich of Passau, to which he gave all his estates as an endowment. In 1114 the new foundation was settled by monks from Göttweig Abbey. Bishop Ulrich dedicated the church in 1116 and granted the abbey the large parish of Aschbach. In 1142 it also received the large parish of Wolfsbach. Out of these two original parishes were formed the fourteen modern parishes for which the abbey is still responsible.

In about 1180 Archbishop Wichmann of Magdeburg granted the abbey the extensive woodlands on the Ybbs, with the duty of setting up a cell there and celebrating divine service in perpetuity. There is also some indication in the first century of the abbey's existence that there was already a school.

Despite many setbacks, including two serious fires and many disputes over property, the abbey gradually developed. In 1347 the community had 22 members. After a lengthy period of decline Abbot Benedikt I, formerly prior of the Schottenstift in Vienna, introduced the Melk Reforms at Seitenstetten, thus bringing about a revival in its spiritual and cultural life. This abbot had a chapel built and dedicated in 1440 on the Sonntagberg and so established the Sonntagberger Pilgrimage under the control and protection of the abbey.

Thereafter the abbey was hard hit by the Hungarian disturbances associated with Matthias Corvinus, the Turkish taxes and above all the Reformation; the number of monks declined sharply.

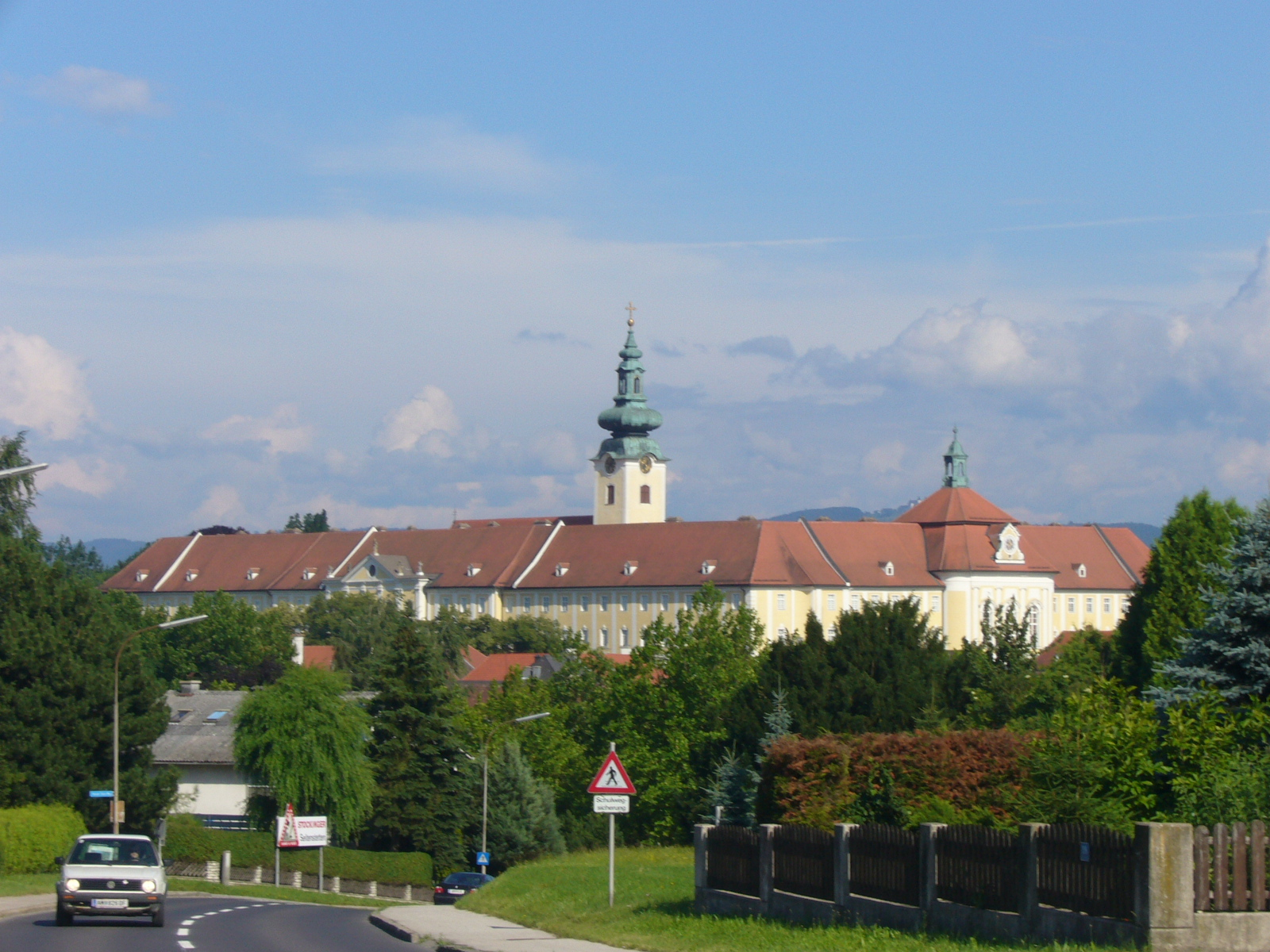
Seitenstetten Abbey

Not until the time of Abbot Christoph Held (1572–1602), with the powerful support of the Imperial Council, was any beginning of spiritual revival possible. Under the abbots that followed, the art of the Baroque made its appearance, and the number of monks was augmented by Bavarians and Swabians. But only after the Thirty Years' War did Abbot Gabriel Sauer (1648–74) finally succeed in stabilising the abbey economically and then in bringing about a true religious renewal.

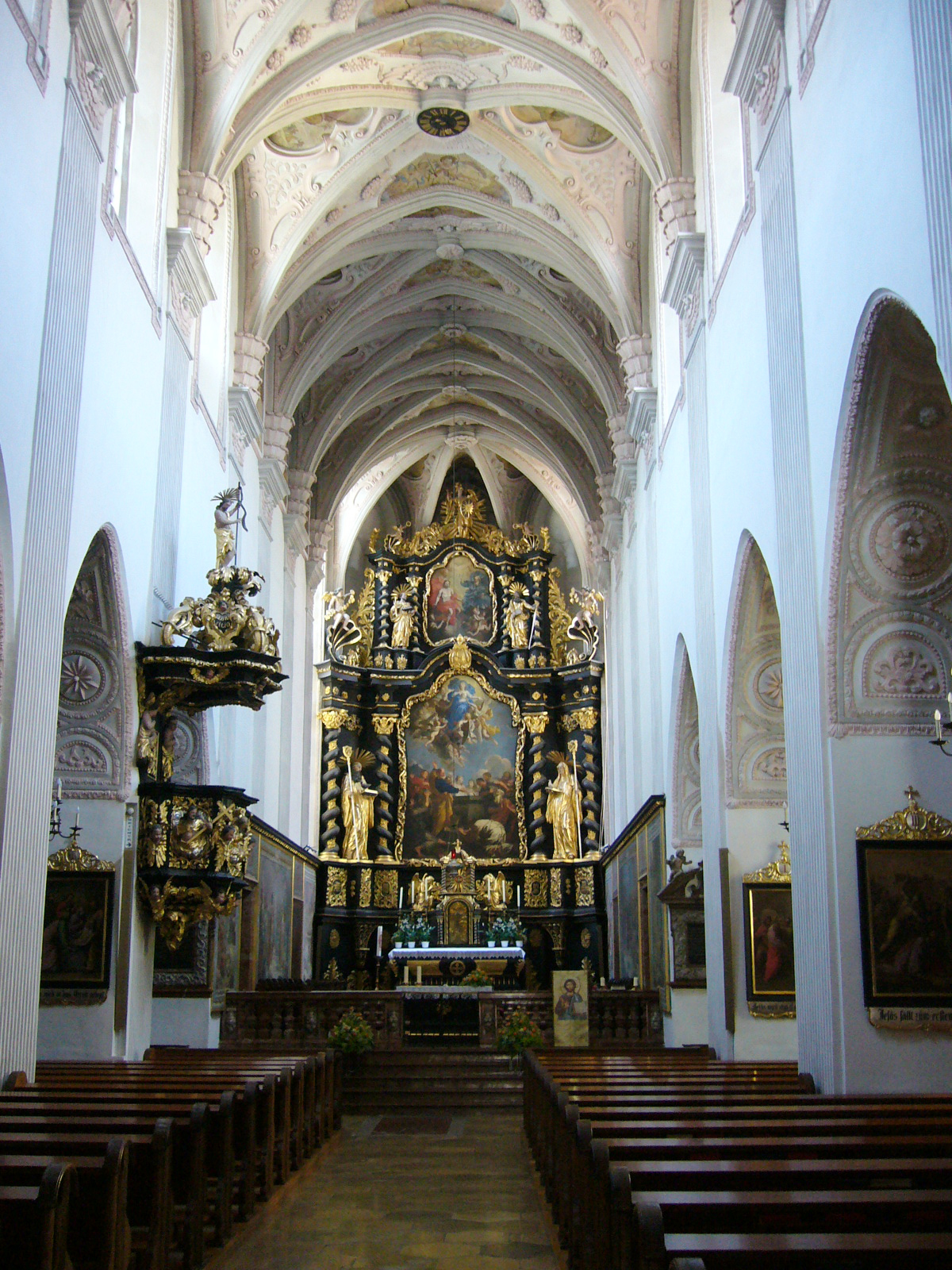
Seitenstetten Abbey church

Now it was also possible for major building work to begin. Abbot Benedikt II Abelzhauser (1687–1717) commissioned Jakob Prandtauer (succeeded in the work by his nephew Josef Munggenast) to build the magnificent Pilgrimage Church of the Holy Trinity on the Sonntagberg. The early Gothic abbey church was lavishly refurbished, including work by Franz Joseph Feuchtmayer.

Paul Vitsch was abbot from 1729 to 1747. Between 1718 and 1747 the Baroque conventual buildings that still stand today were constructed. Ceiling frescoes in the Marble Hall (1735) and the library (1740) were executed by Paul Troger, while those on the grand staircase were by Bartolomeo Altomonte. The summer refectory contains 19 pictures by Kremser Schmidt.

The finance for these lavish works came principally from the abbey's copper mines in the Radmer (Styria) and the brass foundry at Reichraming (Upper Austria).

After the difficulties of the anti-monastic policies of Emperor Joseph II and of the Napoleonic Wars, the abbey gradually regained its strength through the 19th century, until the time of Abbot Theodor Springer (1920–58), who not only brought the abbey safely through the economic crisis after World War I but also through the National Socialist period and World War II without its being dissolved, as so many other monasteries were.

Since the war more renovations have taken place both to the Pilgrimage Church and to the structure of the abbey itself.

Besides the major works of art and architecture mentioned previously, there are also the Romanesque Knights' Chapel (Ritterkapelle), the picture gallery, and the garden, which contains about 110 different types of rose, mostly historical.

Since 1625 the abbey has been a member of the Austrian Congregation, now within the Benedictine Confederation.

== Gallery ==
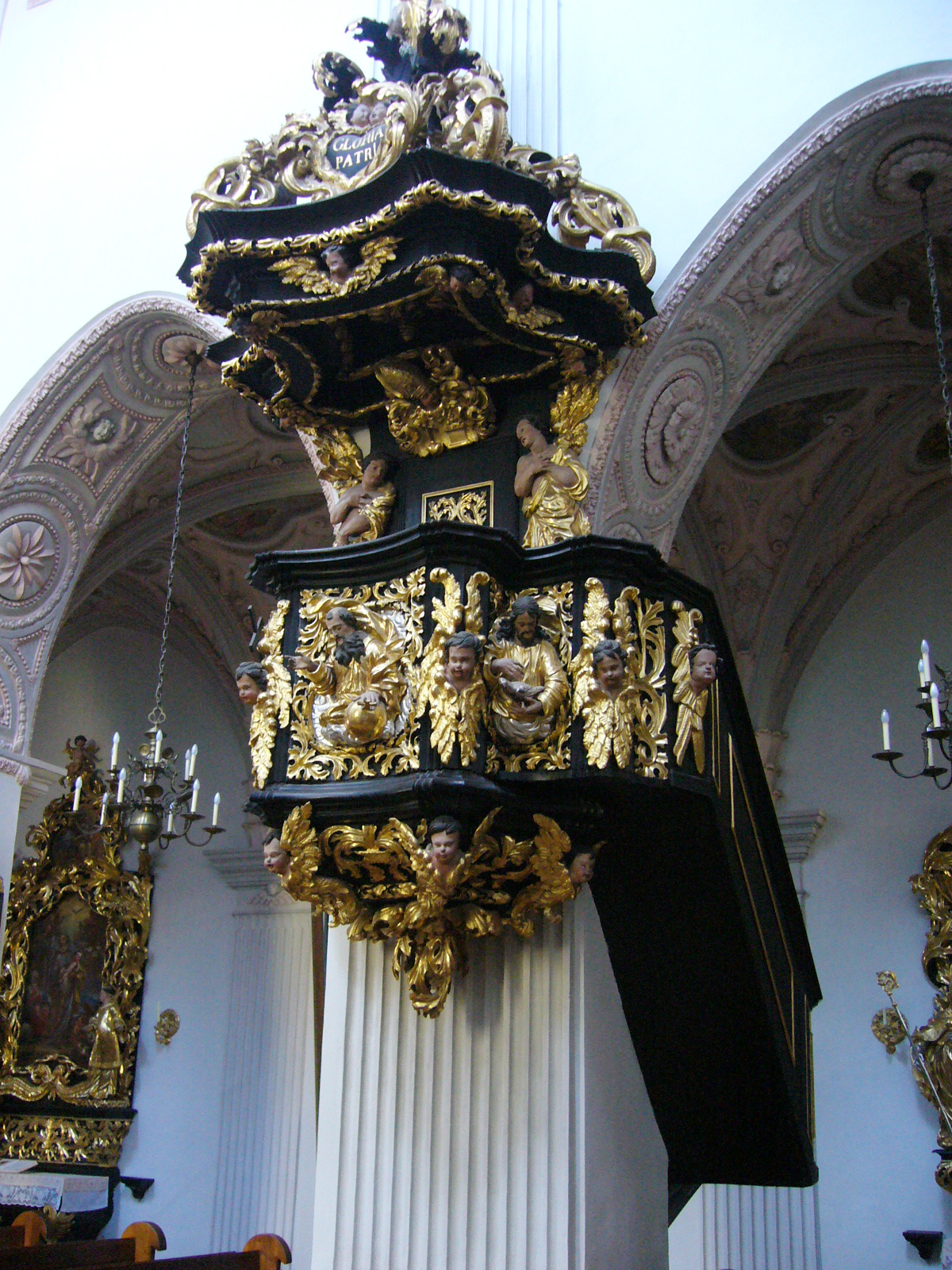
Abbey church: pulpit

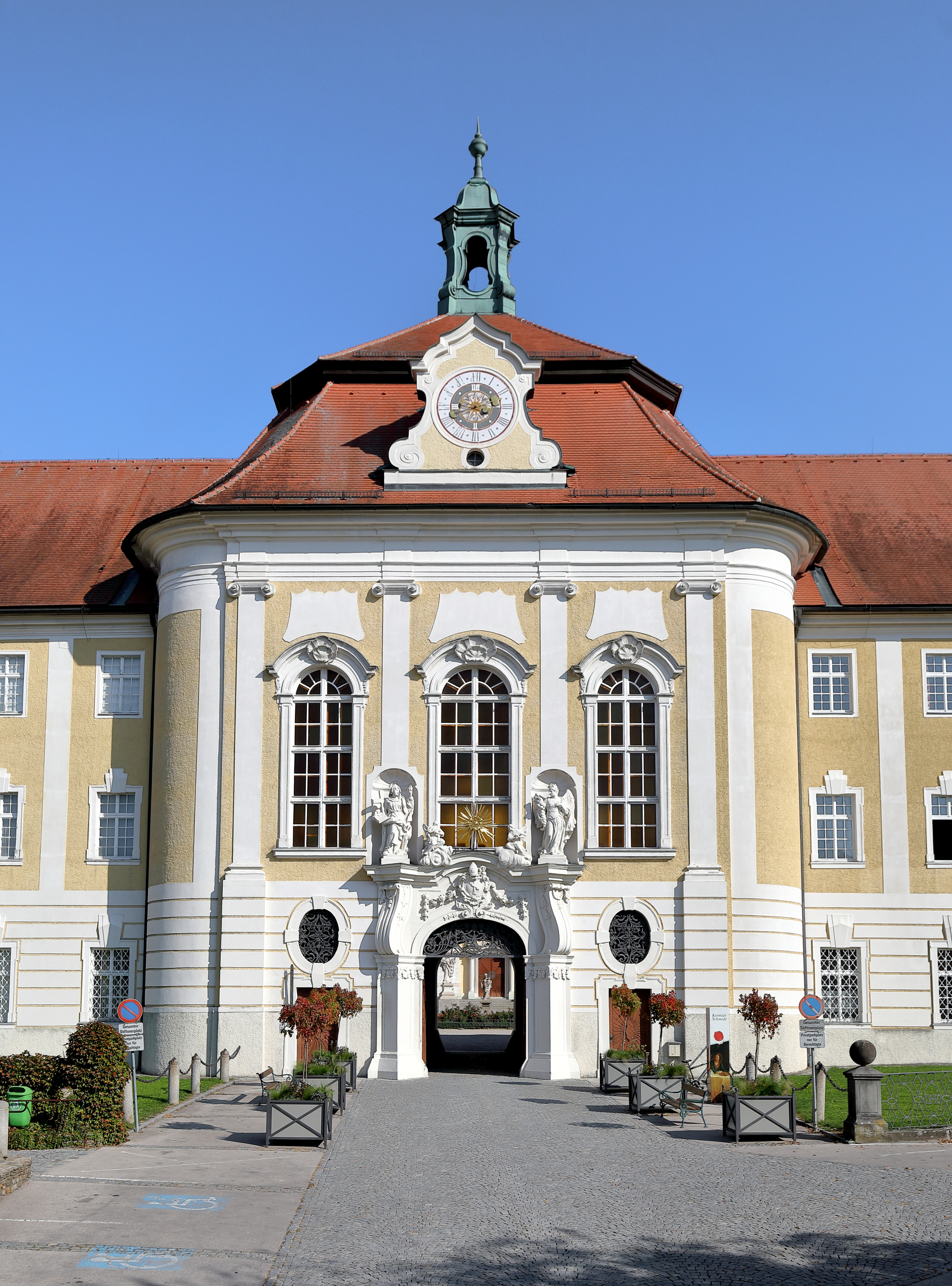
Main frontage

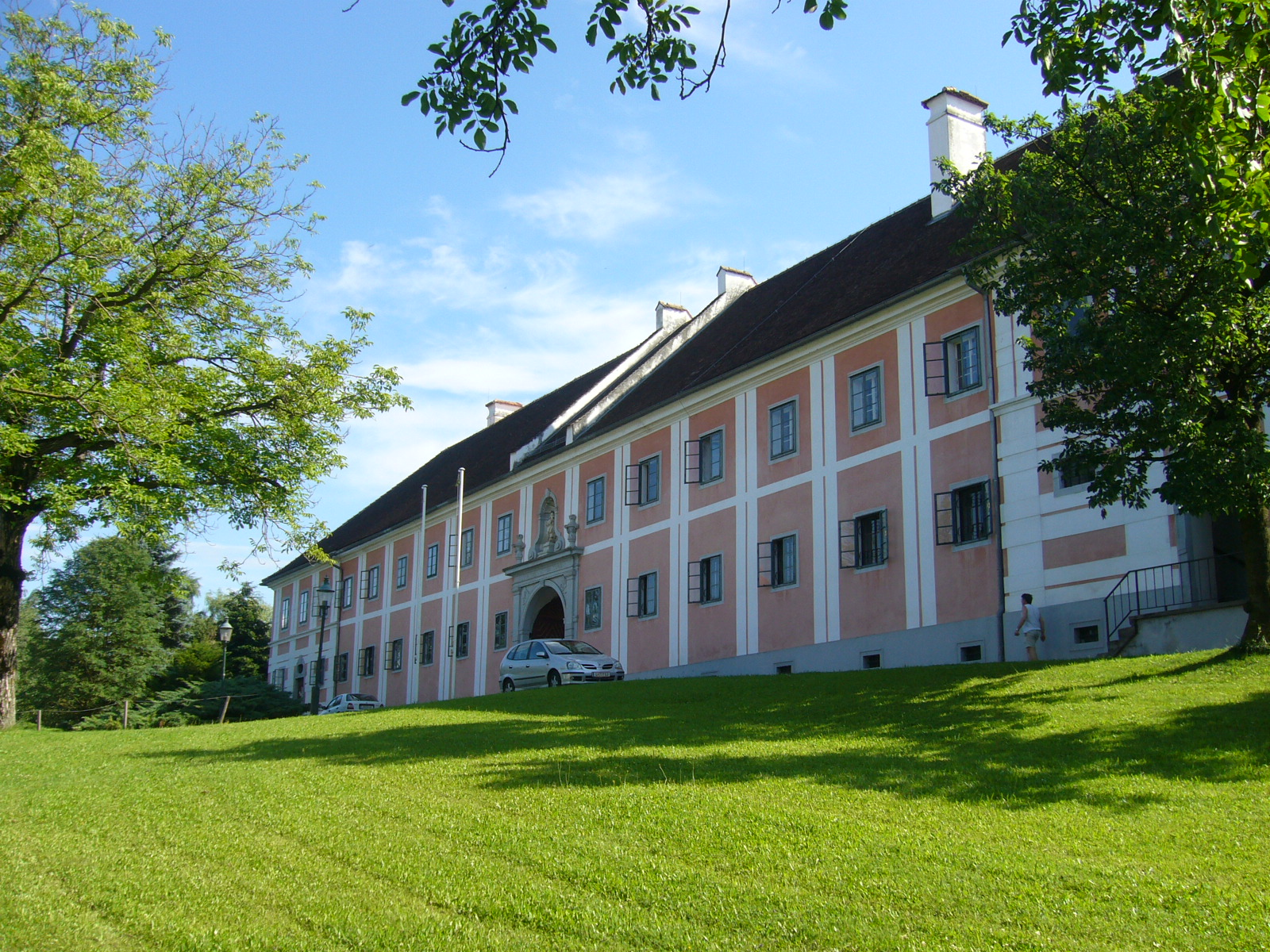
Steward's house

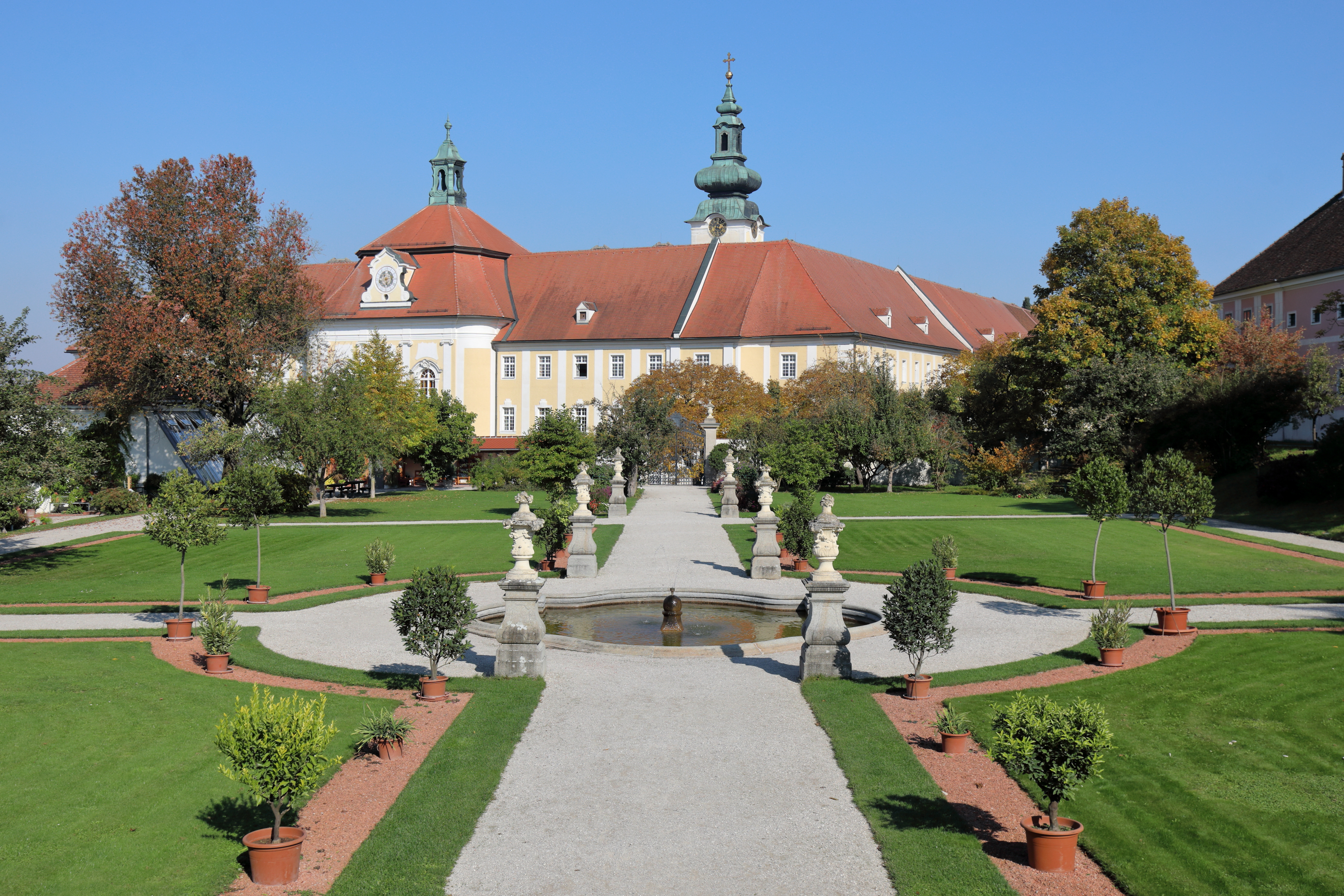
Garden

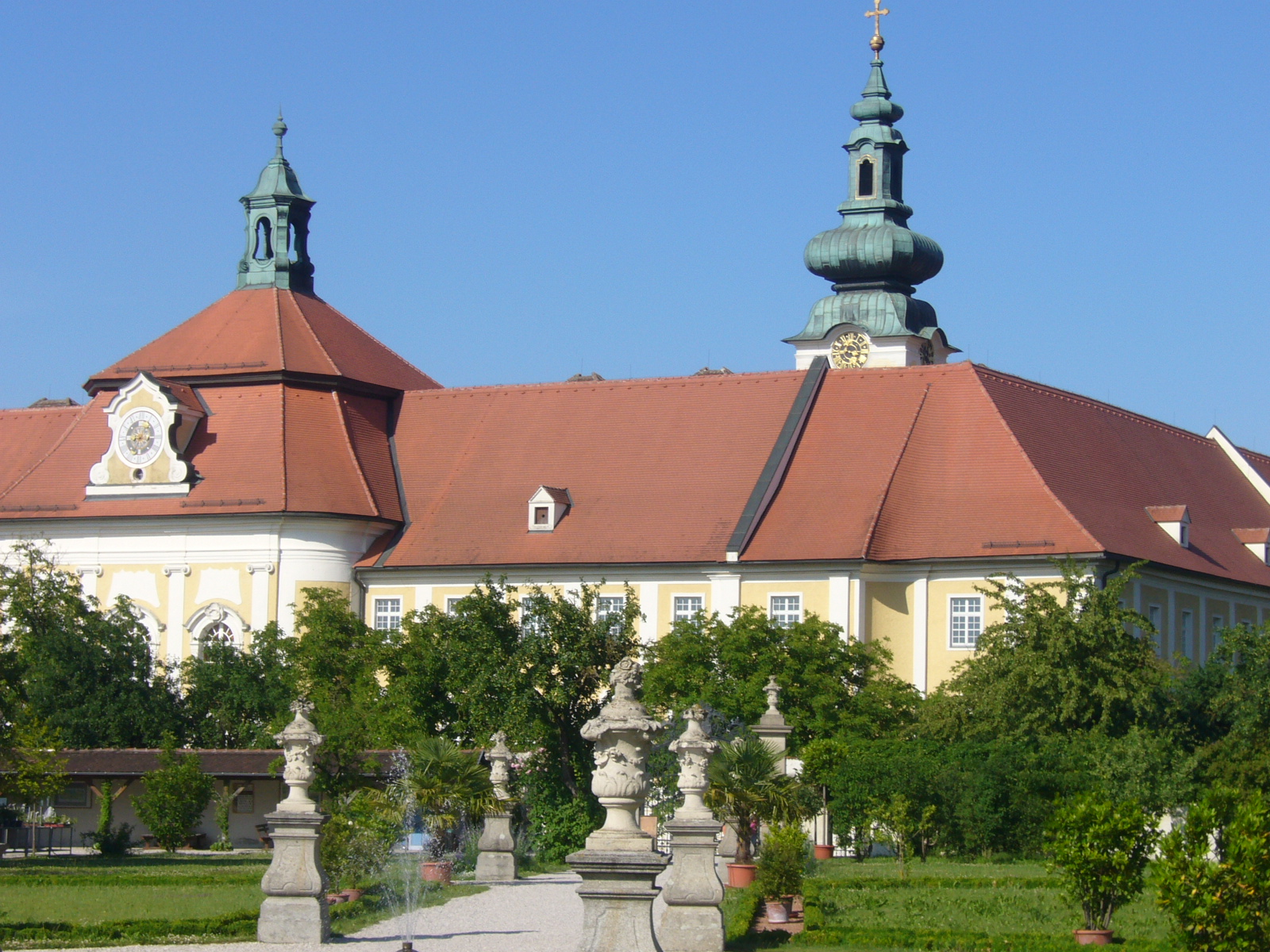
From the garden

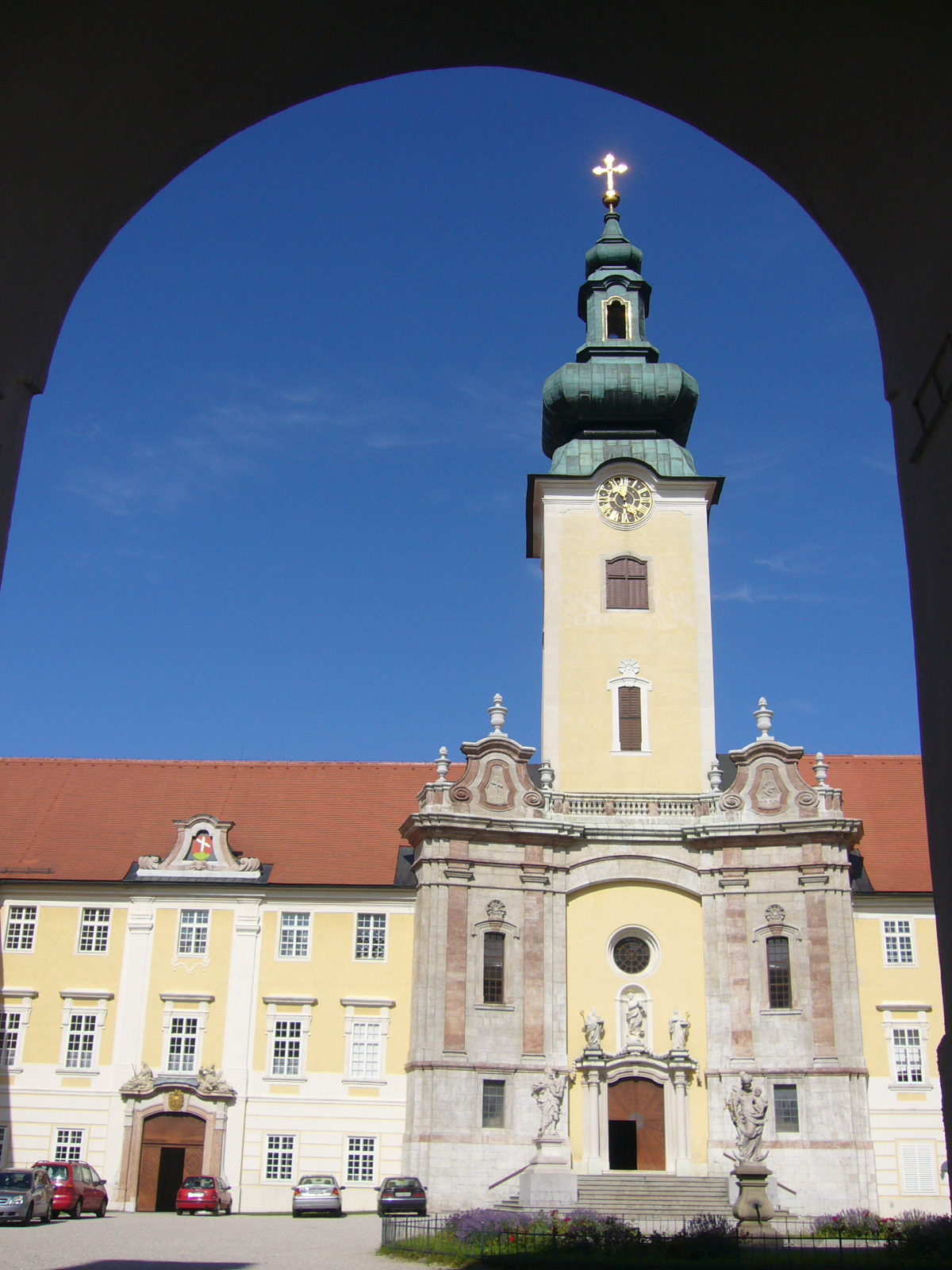
Church exterior

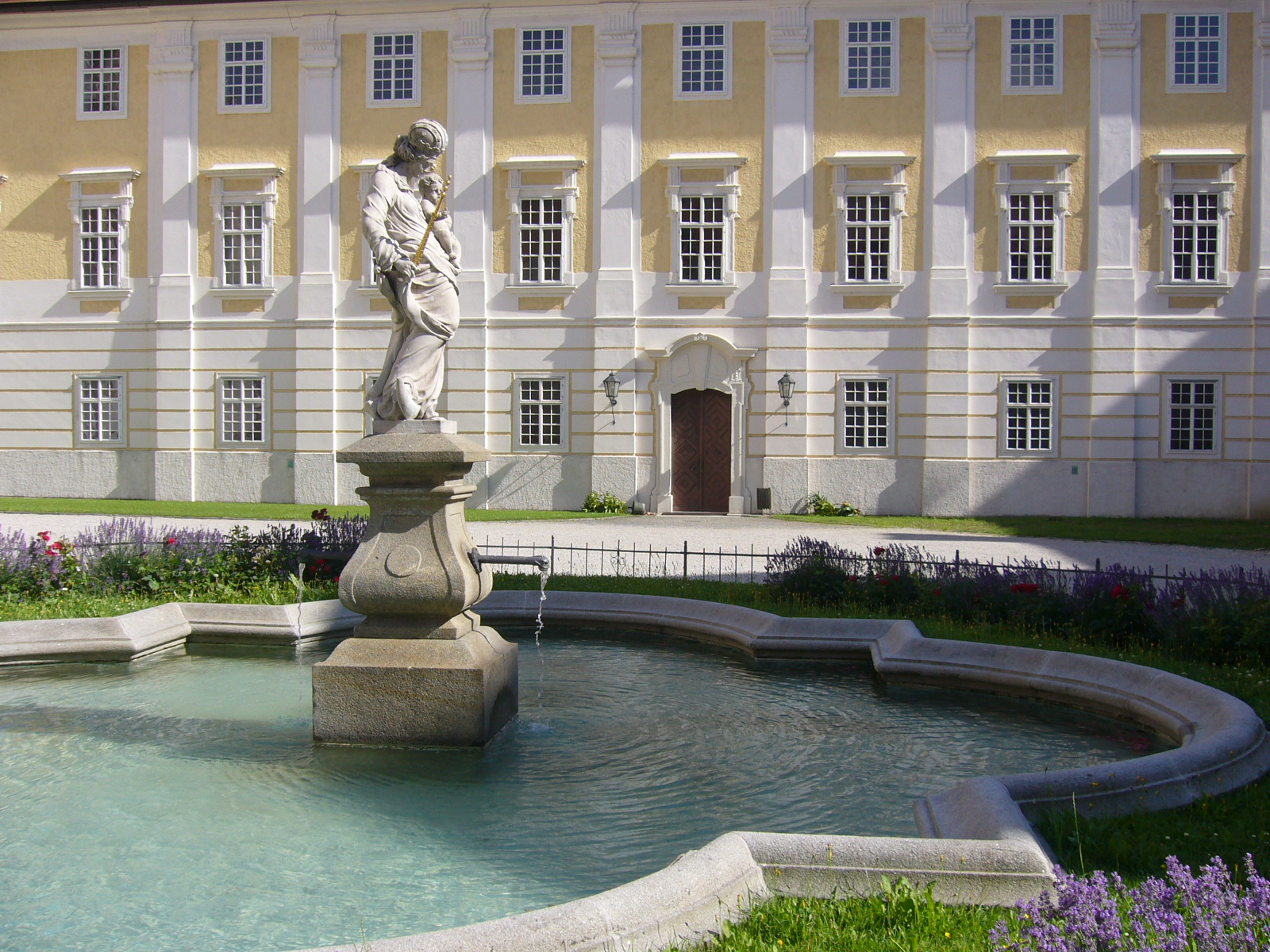
Court with fountain
