= Bartolomeo Altomonte =

Austrian painter

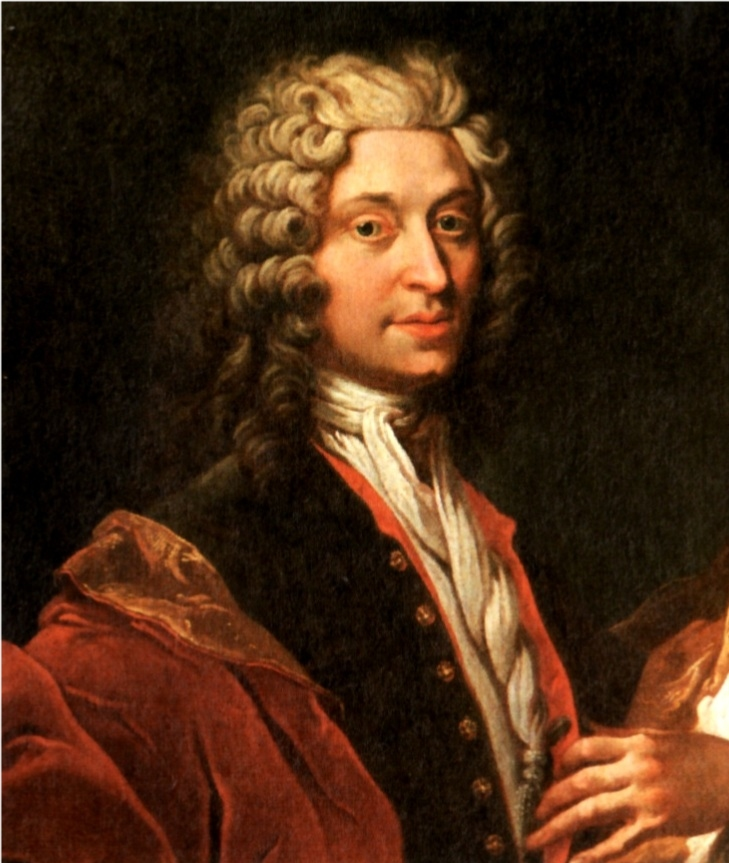
Self-portrait, Oil on canvas

Bartolomeo Altomonte, also known as Bartholomäus Hohenberg (24 February 1694, in Warsaw – 11 November 1783, in Sankt Florian), was an Austrian baroque painter of Italian extraction who specialized in large scale frescoes. Born in Poland, he was the son of Martino Altomonte who was also a painter.

== Biography ==
Altomonte was born in Warsaw, where his father, Martino Altomonte, had been appointed to the court of John III Sobieski, King of Poland. He was the third of six children. He learned from assisting his father at painting, but also from an apprenticeship with Daniel Gran.

He studied with Benedetto Luti in Rome and in Naples with Francesco Solimena. A sketchbook compiled by Altomonte while with Luti is in the Albertina.

From 1722 he lived in Austria. Altomonte spent most of his life in Linz and worked primarily in Austrian monasteries such as St. Florian's Priory and Admont Abbey. In 1747 he painted a ceiling fresco for the library at St. Florian's.

Other frescoes and altarpieces he painted for the convents of Wilhering, Herzogenburg, for the cathedral of Sankt Pölten, and for churches in Vienna. In Seitenstetten Abbey the frescoes on the Grand Staircase are by Altomonte. Around 1740, he did an oil on canvas painting of the Wunder des heiligen Nikolaus for Neuberg Abbey.

Tendencies towards the rococo remained foreign to the artist all his life; he is considered one of the last great painters in the manner of the baroque allegory.

== Works ==
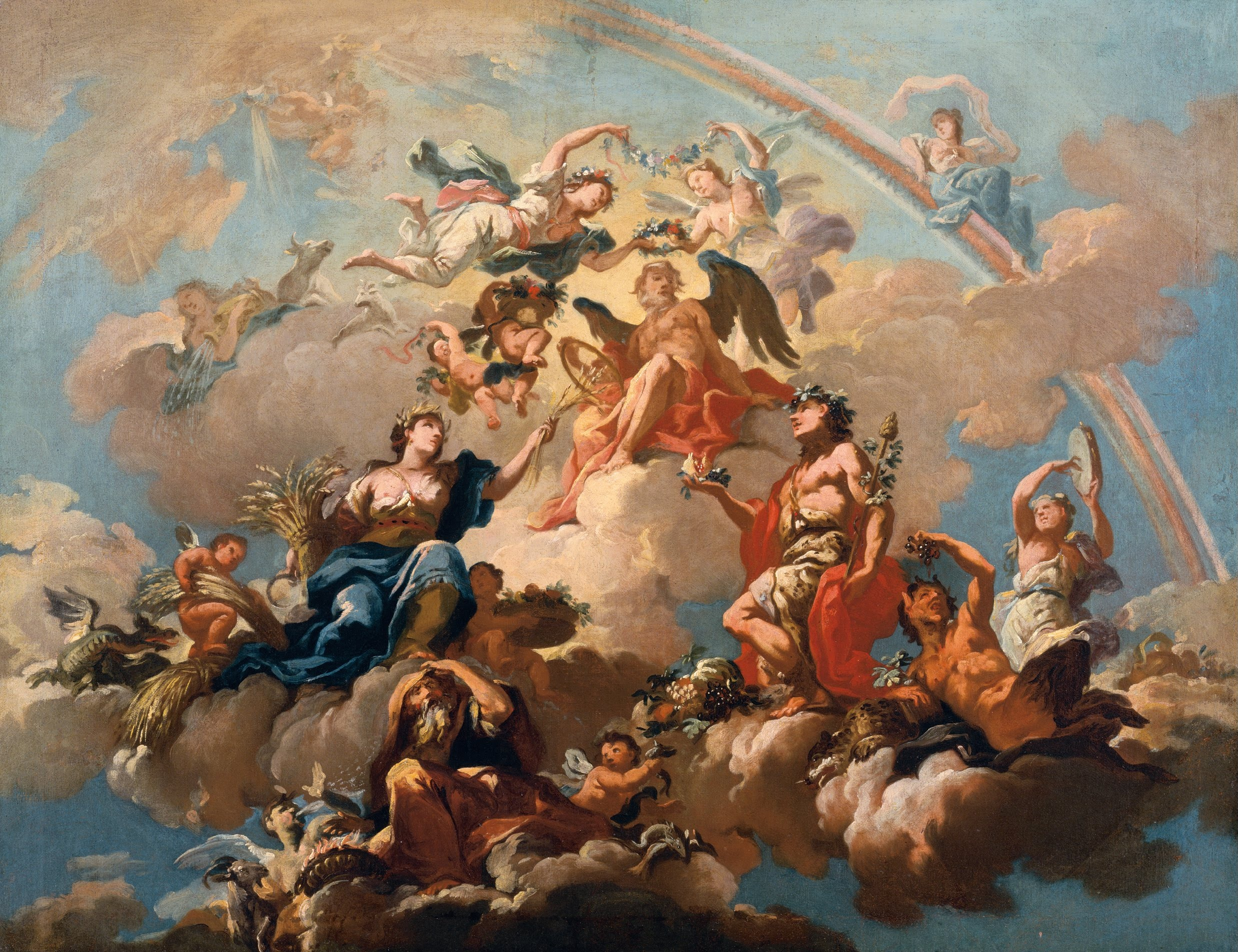
The Four Seasons Favoring Chronos (1737), oil on canvas. In the collection of the Residenzgalerie, Salzburg

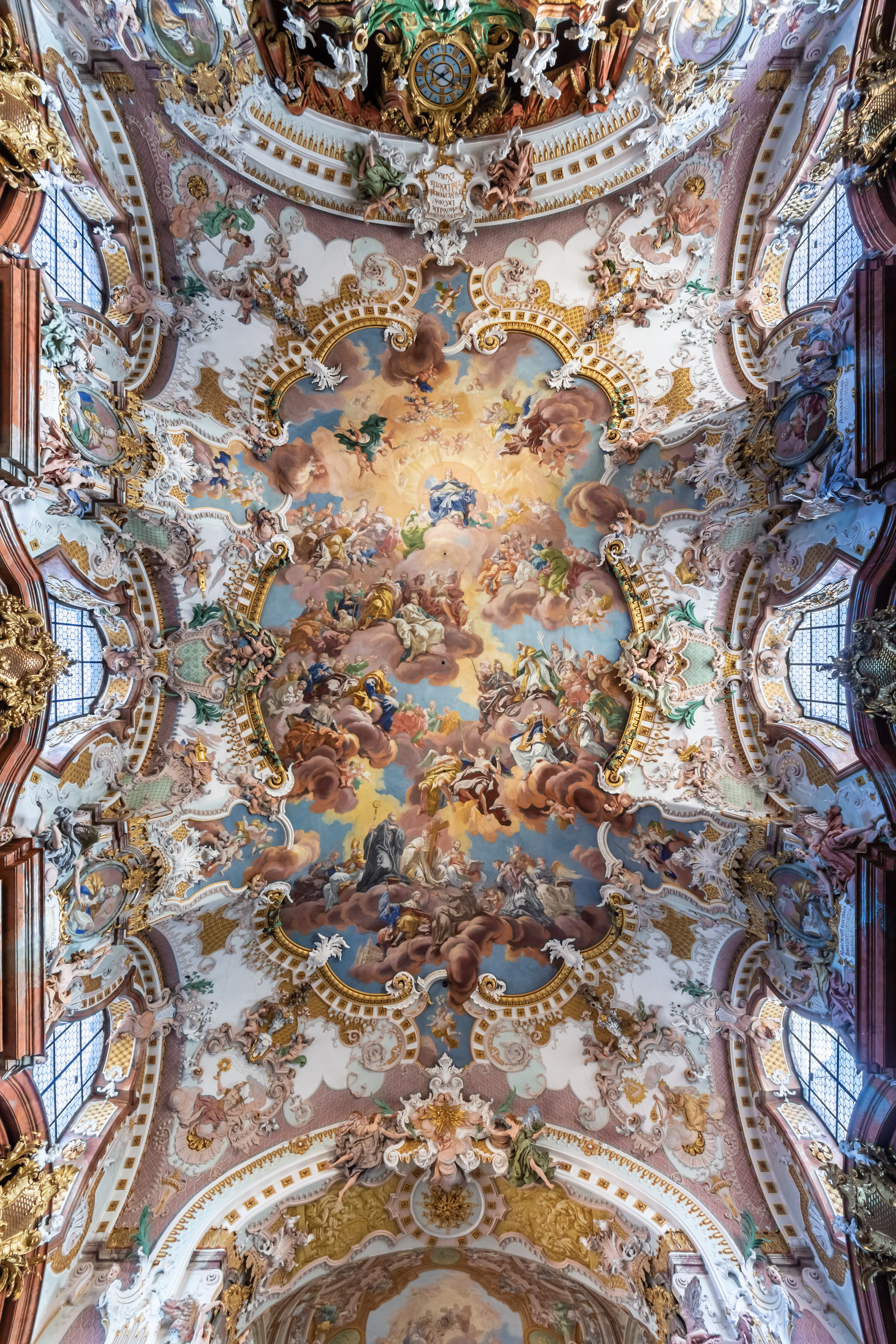
Ceiling frescoes at the Wilhering Abbey

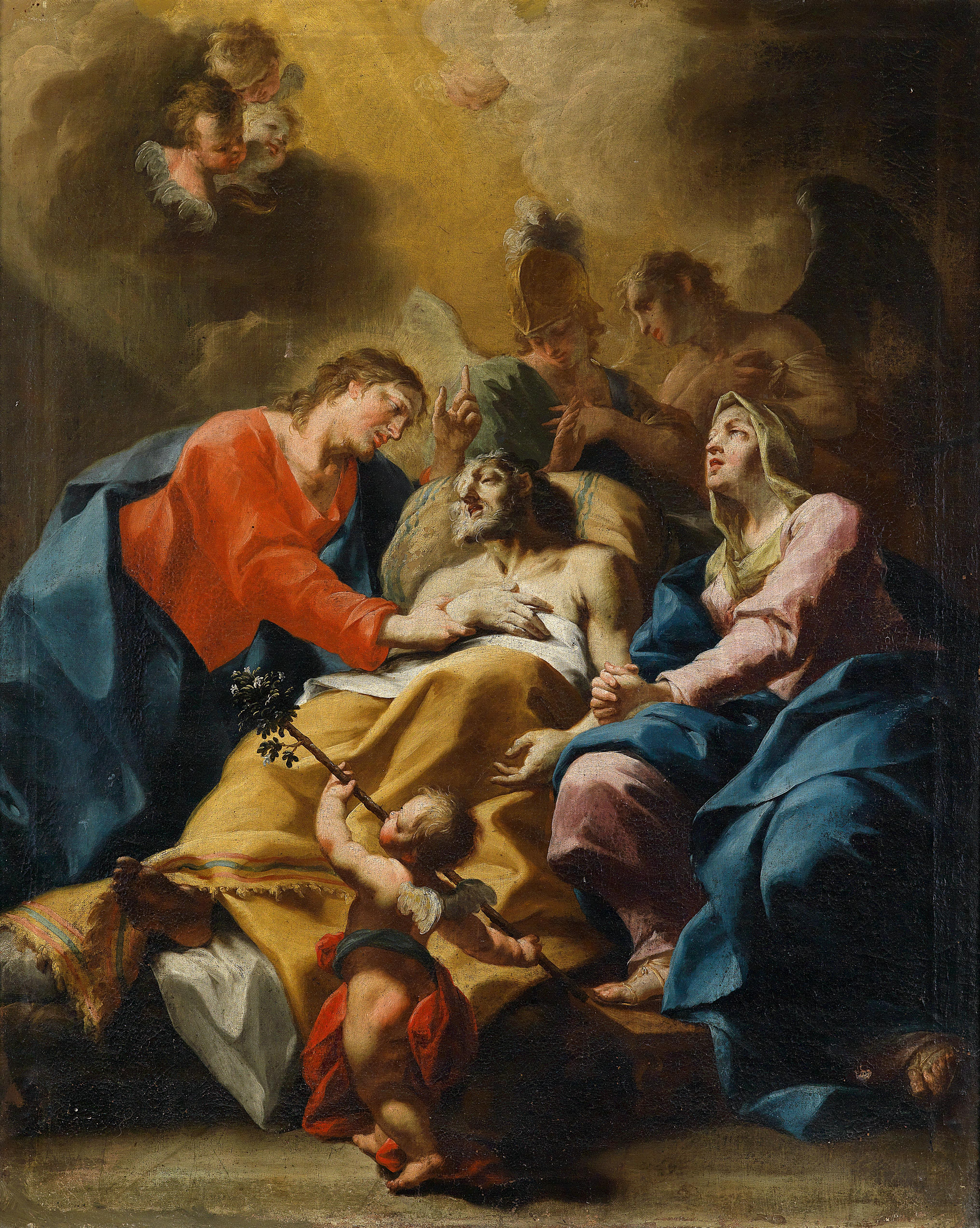
The death of St. Joseph

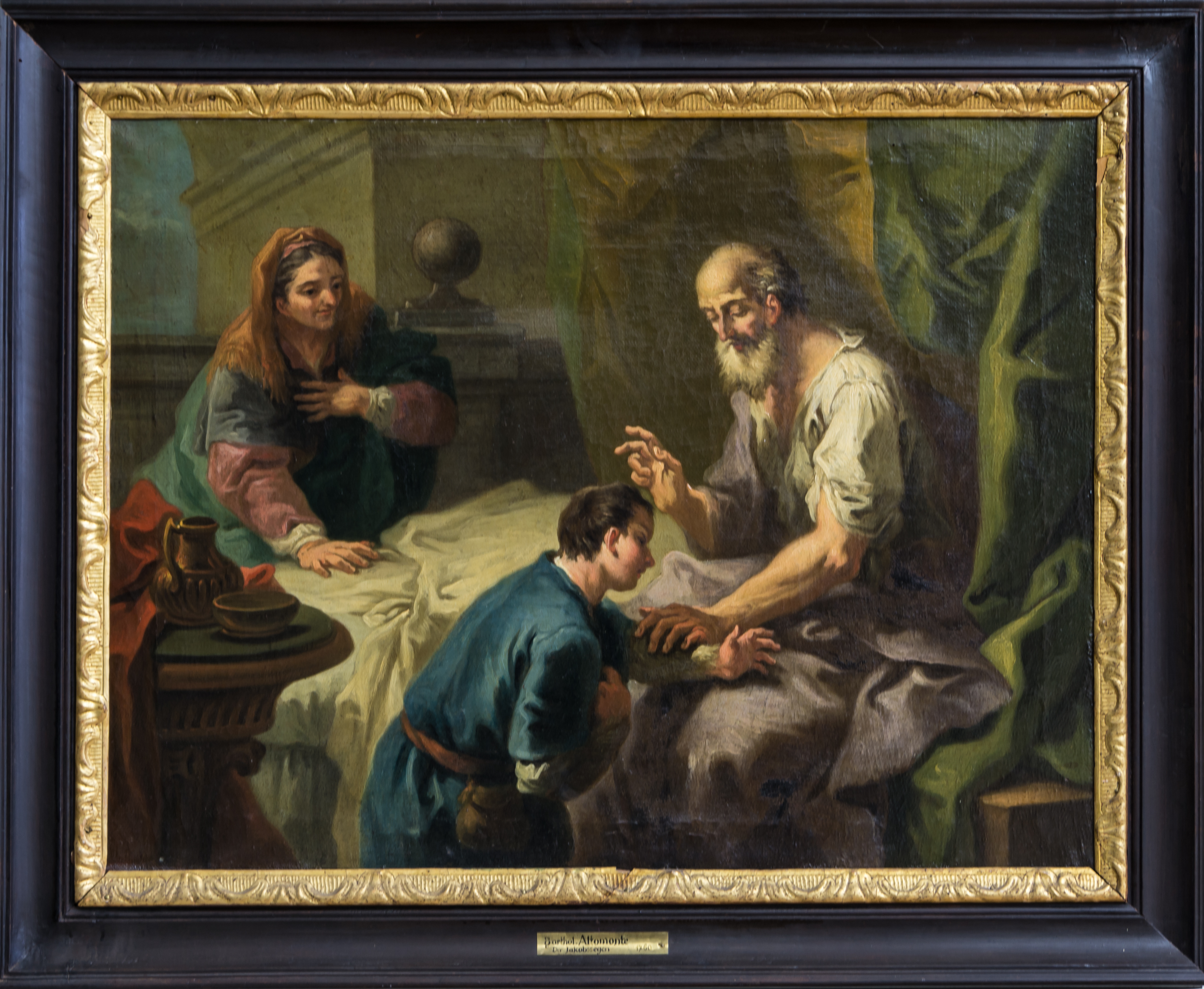
Isaac blessing Jacob, 1760

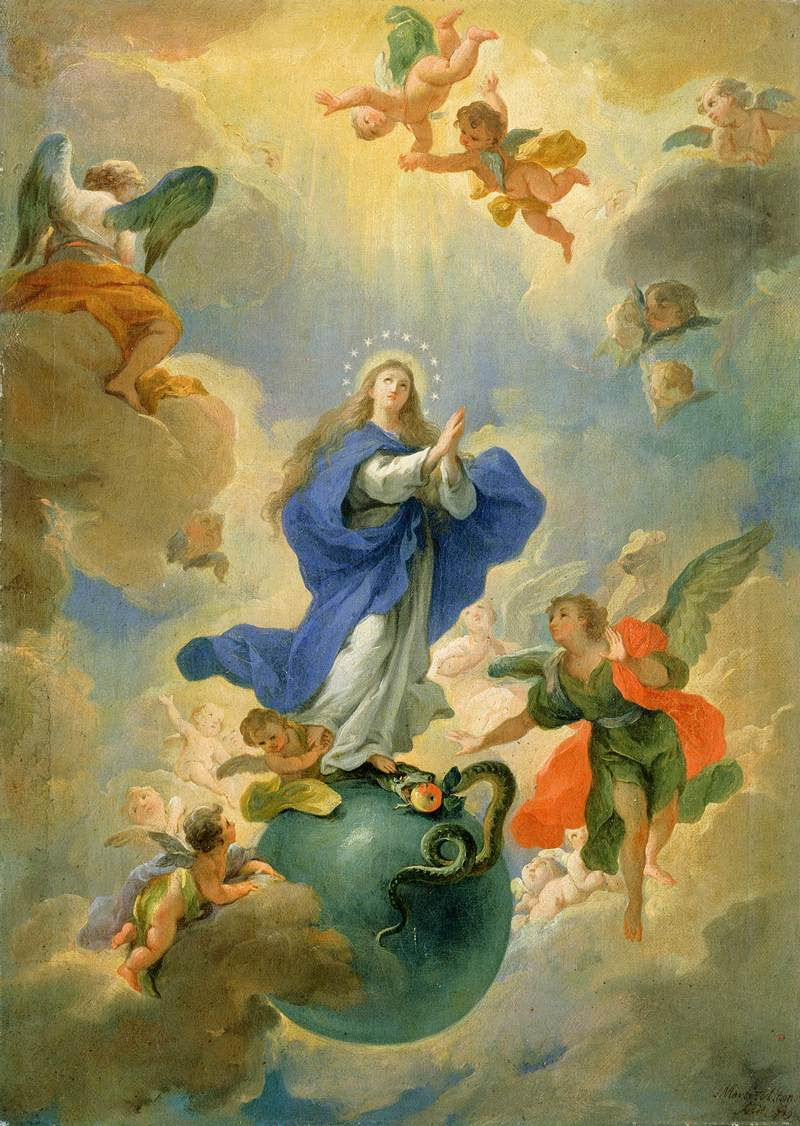
The Immaculate Conception, 1719

== Bibliography ==
- Duller, Eduard (1845). Maria Teresa ed i suoi tempi [Maria Teresa and her times] (in Italian). Vol. 1. Milano: Carlo Rettig.
- Weiß (1875). "Altomonte" . Allgemeine Deutsche Biographie (in German). Vol. 1. Leipzig: Duncker & Humblot. p. 372.
- Heinzl, Brigitte (2003). "Altomonte family". Grove Art Online. Oxford: OUP. doi:10.1093/gao/9781884446054.article.t002146. ISBN 978-1-884446-05-4.
- Lehr, Rudolf (2004). Landeschronik Oberösterreich 3000 Jahre in Daten, Dokumenten und Bildern [Country chronicle of Upper Austria 3000 years in data, documents and images] (in German). Vienna. ISBN 978-3-85498-331-6.
- Salvadori, Giovanni (1891). La congregazione della chiesa nazionale italiana in Vienna. Notizie storiche estratte da documenti originali [The congregation of the Italian national church in Vienna. Historical information extracted from original documents] (in Italian). Vol. 1. Drexher & Company.
