= Franz Feuchtmayer =

Franz Feuchtmayer may refer to:

- Franz Joseph Feuchtmayer (1660–1718), sculptor and stuccoist
- Franz Xaver Feuchtmayer (1705–1764), German Baroque stucco plasterer
- Franz Xaver Feuchtmayer the Younger (born 1735), German artist
