= Matthäus Günther =

German painter (1705–1788)

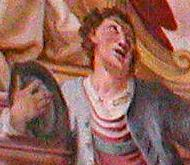
Self-portrait by Günther in a fresco in the Rosary Chapel of the Augustinian Canonry in Markt Indersdorf

Matthäus Günther (also Mathäus Günther) (7 September 1705 – 30 September 1788) was an important German painter and artist of the Baroque and Rococo era.

Günther, who was born in Peissenberg (at that time: Tritschengreith), helped develop the rococo style of painting in Bavaria and Tyrol, working on over 40 churches. His known work includes about 70 frescoes and 25 panels. In particular, he was known for his lifelike imagery and lively coloring.

Günther studied in Munich from 1723 to 1728 with Cosmas Damian Asam, the older of the two Asam brothers, and perfected his fresco painting in Augsburg. Günther frequently worked with some of the greatest artists of his time, including the architect Johann Michael Fischer and the plasterer Johann Michael Feuchtmayer and his brother Franz Xaver. He died in Haid near Wessobrunn.

== Major works ==
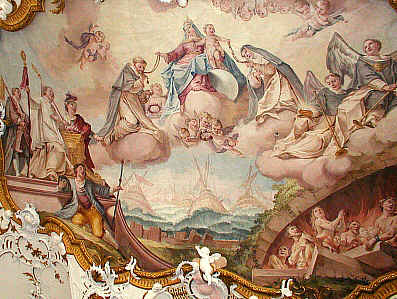
Fresco (1755) with scenes of the Battle of Lepanto in the Augustinian Canonry in Markt Indersdorf

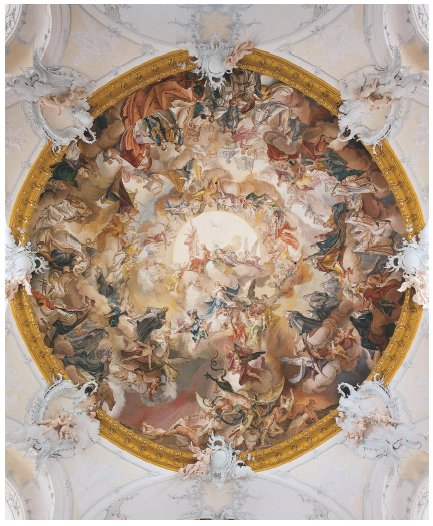
Dome fresco in the Benedictine Abbey Church of St. Marinus and St. Anianus in Rott am Inn

=== Bavaria ===
- Amorbach—Benedictine Abbey Church of St. Maria (high altar and ceiling frescoes) (1742–1747)
- Dießen am Ammersee—Church of St. Georgen (parts of altar) (1750)
- Friedberg—Pilgrimage Church of the Peace of the Lord (ceiling painting in the nave) (1747; 1764)
- Fürstenzell—Church of the Ascension of the Blessed Virgin (ceiling frescoes)
- Garmisch-Partenkirchen—New Parish Church of St. Martin (ceiling frescoes) (1733)
- Greisstätt-Altenhohenau—Monastery Church of St. Peter and St. Paul (choir fresco)
- Indersdorf—Augustinian Canonry (frescoes depicting life of St. Augustine) (1755)
- Mittenwald—Parish Church of St. Peter and St. Paul (ceiling paintings and high altar; tower) (1740; 1746)
- Oberammergau—Catholic Parish Church (frescoes) (1759; 1761)
- Polling bei Weilheim—Lay brothers' refectory of the Augustinian Canonry Church (fresco of Parnassus) (1775–1778)
- Rott am Inn—Benedictine Abbey Church of St. Marinus and St. Anianus (dome frescoes and other frescoes) (1763)
- Rottenbuch—Augustinian Church of Birth of the Virgin (frescoes of the life of St. Augustine) (1750)
- Schongau—Parish Church of Mariae Himmelfahrt (frescoes) (1753)
- Wessobrunn—Kreuzberg Chapel (ceiling frescoes) (1771–1772)
- Wessobrunn—Pilgrimage Church of St. Leonhard im Forst (ceiling frescoes) (1761)
- Würzburg—Pilgrimage Church of St. Maria (Marienkapelle) (frescoes) (1752)

=== Tyrol ===
- Fieberbrunn—Chapel of Johann Nepomuk (frescoes) (1762)
- Fiecht—Collegiate Church of St. Josef (frescoes) (1740–1744)
- Götzens—Parish Church of the Apostles Peter and Paul (dome frescoes of lives of Peter and Paul) (1775)
- Grins—Parish Church of St. Nikolaus (stucco and ceiling paintings) (1779)
- Innsbruck—Chapel of Schloss Mentelberg (stucco and ceiling paintings)
- Innsbruck—Wilten Basilica (1754) (ceiling frescoes) (1770)
- Rattenberg—Parish Church of St. Virgil (ceiling frescoes and fresco in the sacristy) (1736)
