= Feuchtmayer =

German artist family

The Feuchtmayers (also spelled Feuchtmayr, Feichtmair, and Feichtmayr) were a German family of artists from the Baroque Wessobrunner School.

The best-known members of the family were the brothers Franz Joseph, Johann Michael (the Elder), and Michael; their sons; and one grandson:

- Franz Joseph Feuchtmayer (1660–1718)
  - Joseph Anton Feuchtmayer (1696–1770)
- Johann Michael Feuchtmayer the Elder (1666–1713)
- Michael Feuchtmayer (born 1667) was a brother of Franz Joseph and Johann Michael, and the father of Franz Xaver, the Elder, as well as of Johann Michael, the Younger.
  - Franz Xaver Feuchtmayer the Elder (1705–1764)
    - Franz Xaver Feuchtmayer the Younger (born 1735)
  - Johann Michael Feuchtmayer the Younger (1709–1772)

== Bibliography ==
- Austria: A Phaidon Cultural Guide. Oxford: Phaidon, 1985. ISBN 0-7148-2376-7.
- Germany: A Phaidon Cultural Guide. Oxford: Phaidon, 1985. ISBN 0-7148-2354-6.
- Swiss Institute for Art Research's SIKART Dictionary and Database

== Gallery of Works by Franz Joseph Feuchtmayer ==
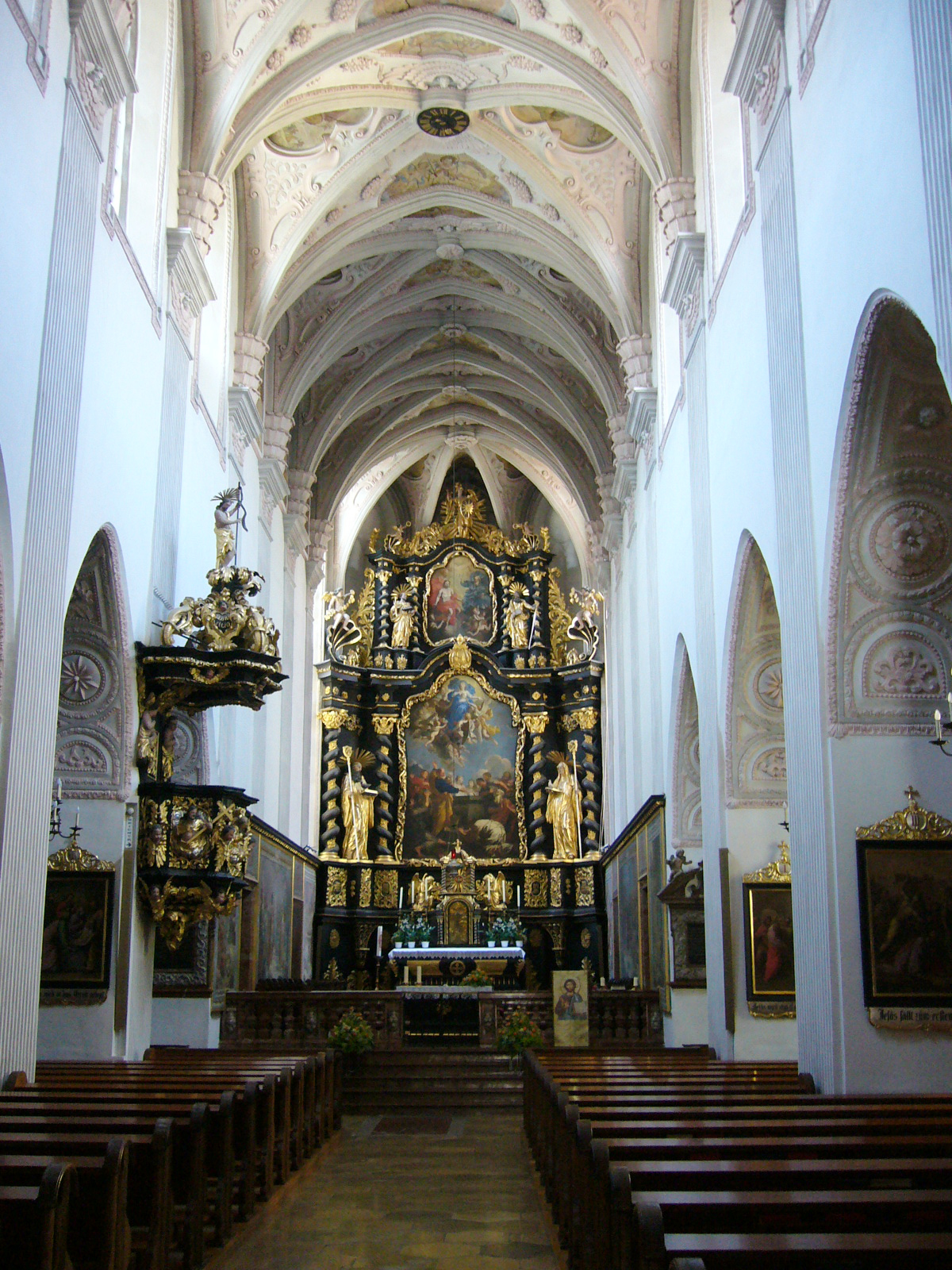
Interior of the Parish Church of St. Maria in Seitenstetten, Austria, showing the high altar and pulpit sculptures by F. J. Feuchtmayer

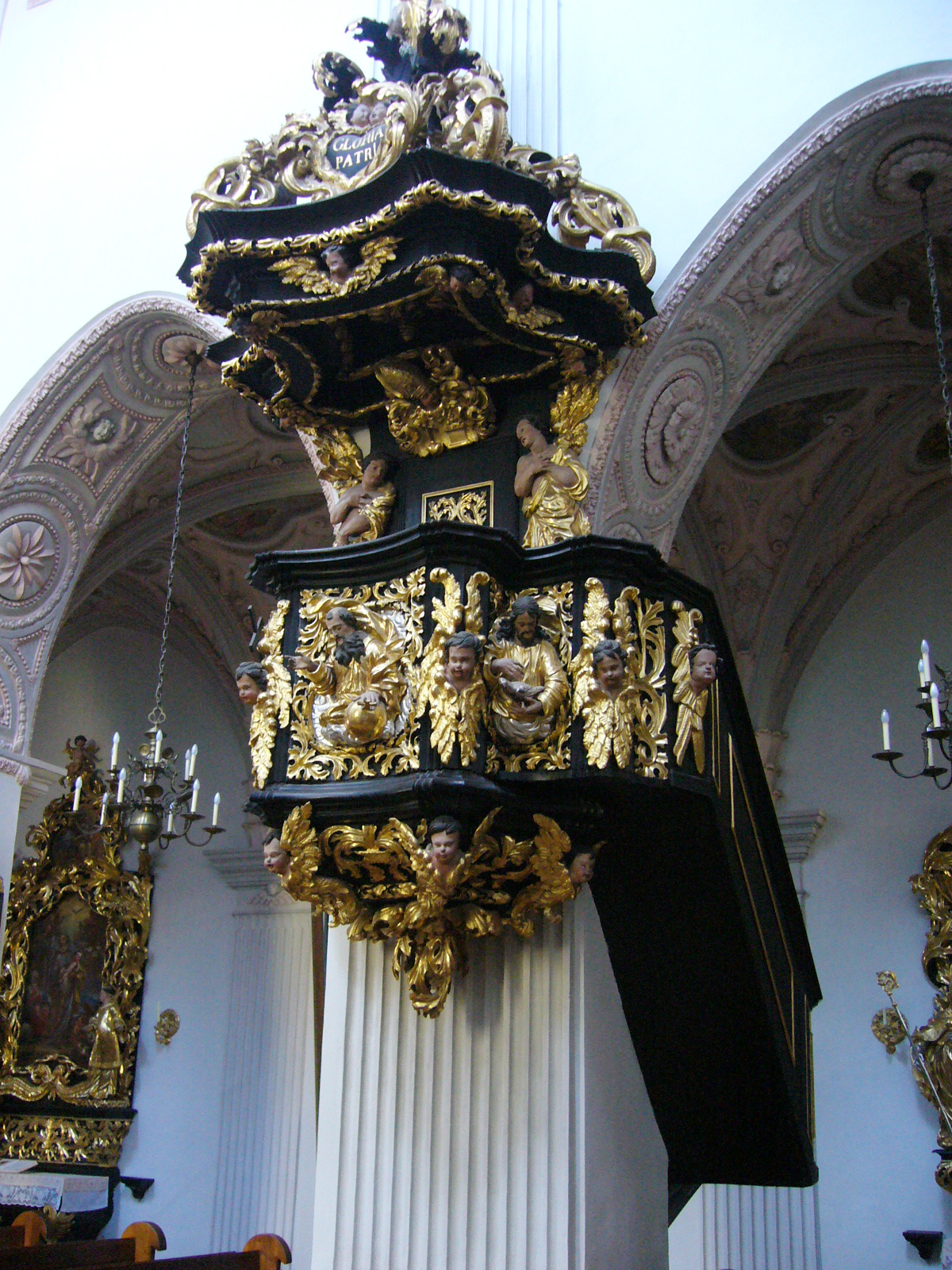
Pulpit in the Parish Church of St. Maria in Seitenstetten

== Gallery of Works by Joseph Anton Feuchtmayer ==
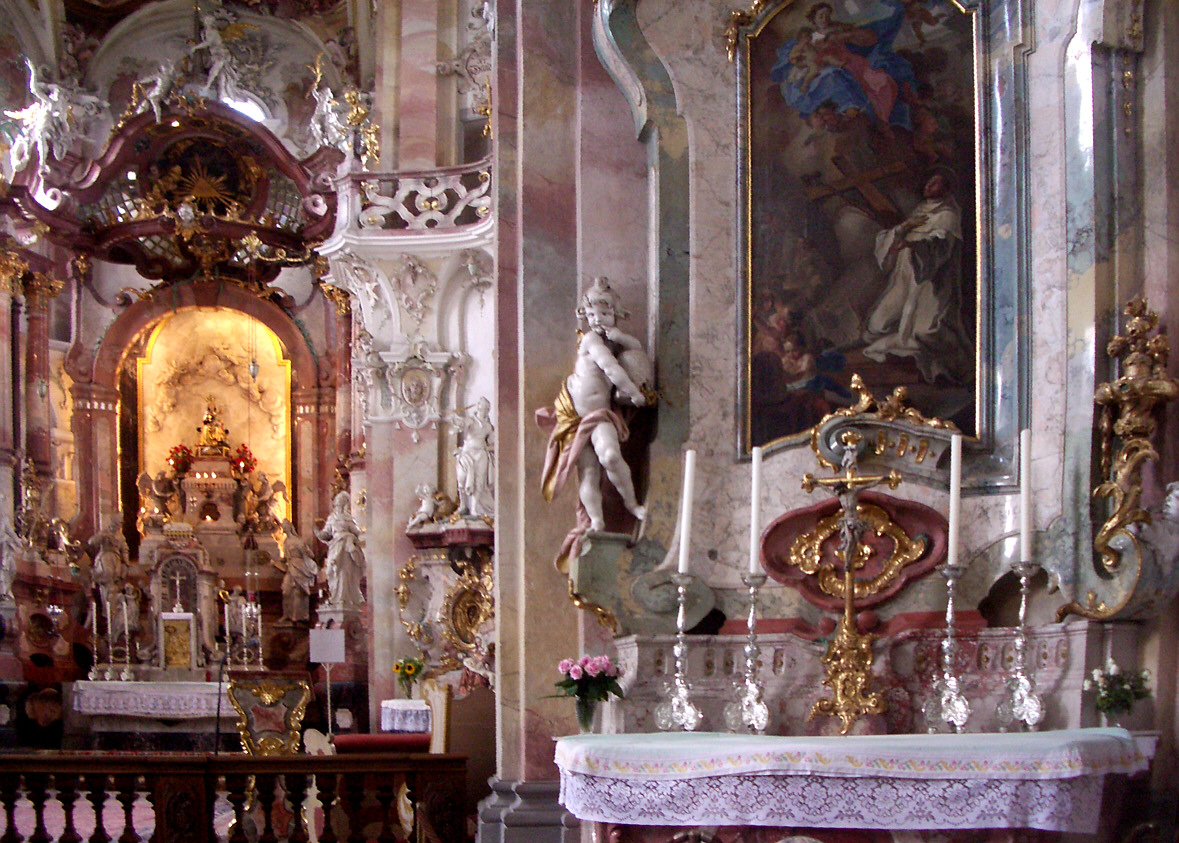
Interior view of the Wallfahrtskirche Birnau with "Honigschlecker" putto (center) in Überlingen, Germany

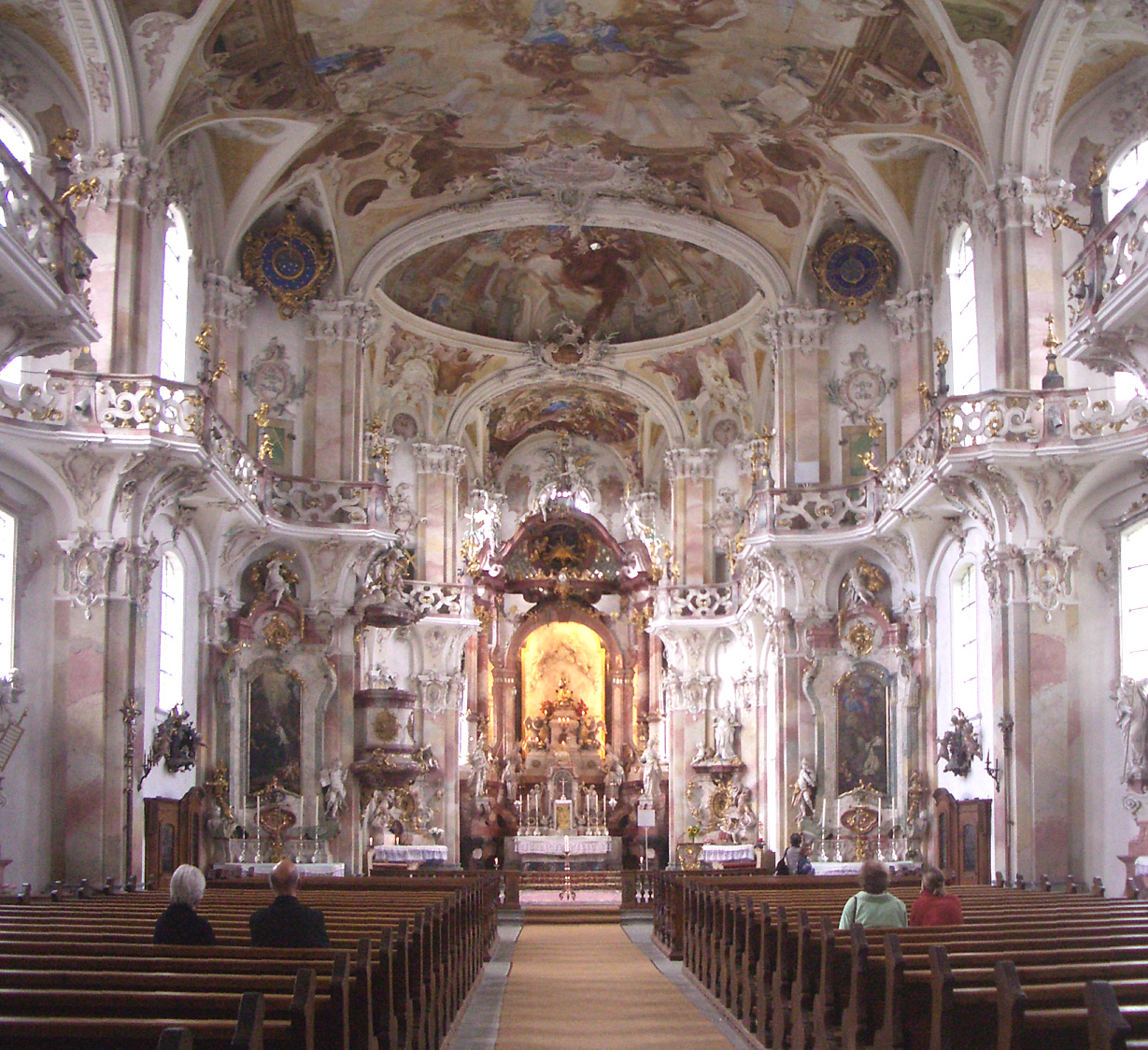
Interior view of the Wallfahrtskirche Birnau with the high altar

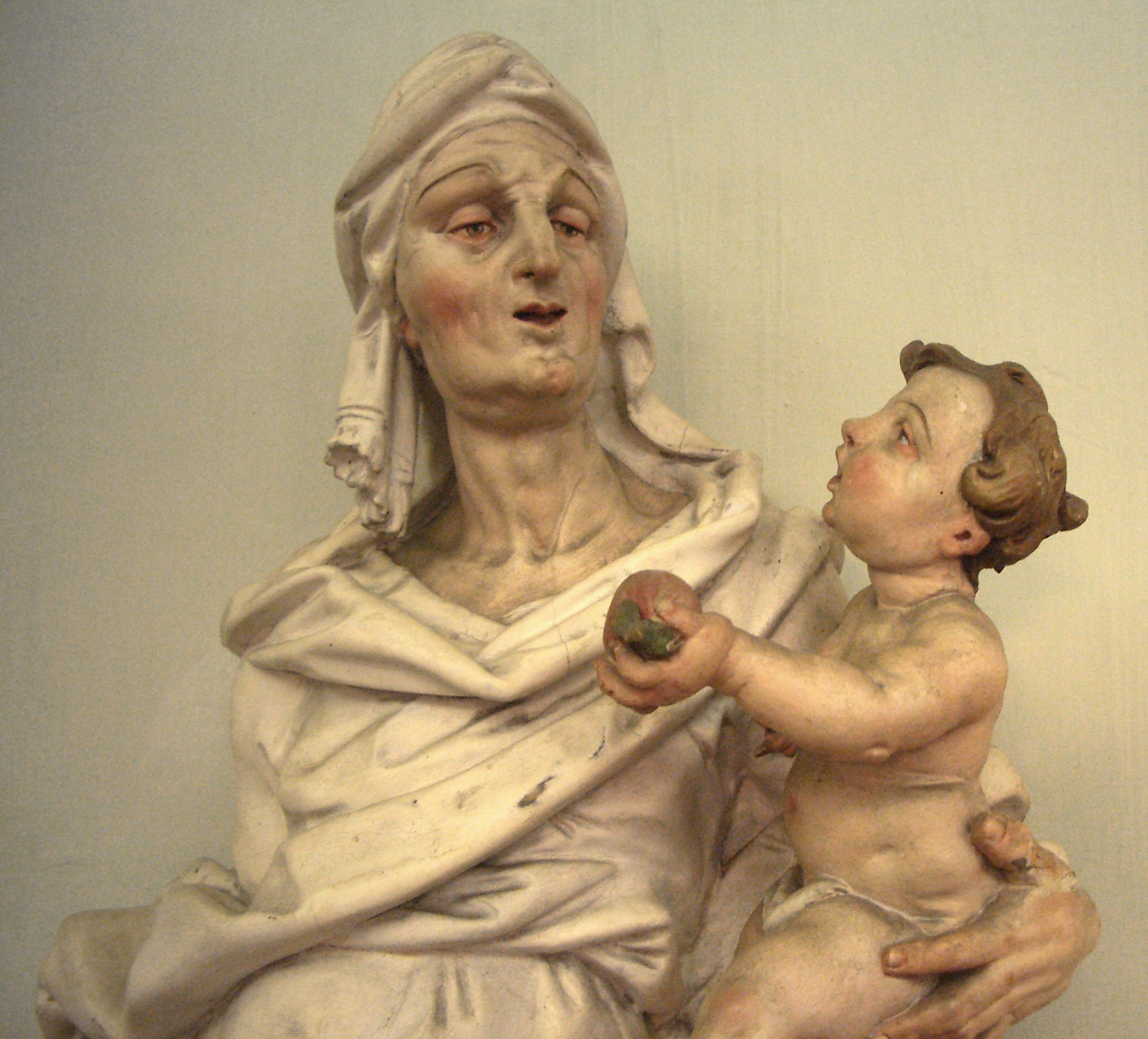
St. Anna Selbdritt (1750), detail (currently in the Stadtmuseum in Überlingen)

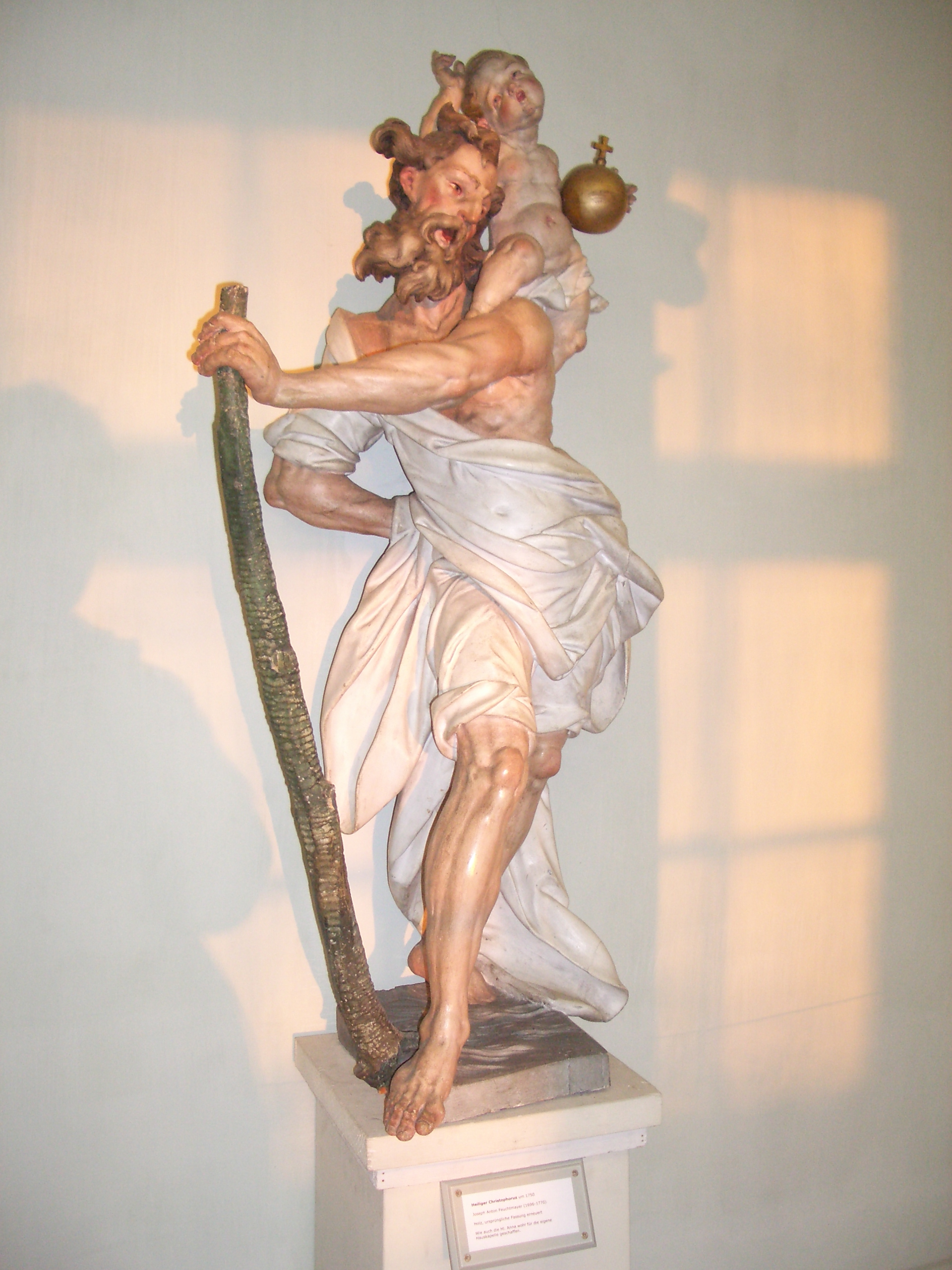
St. Christopher (1750) (currently in the Stadtmuseum in Überlingen)

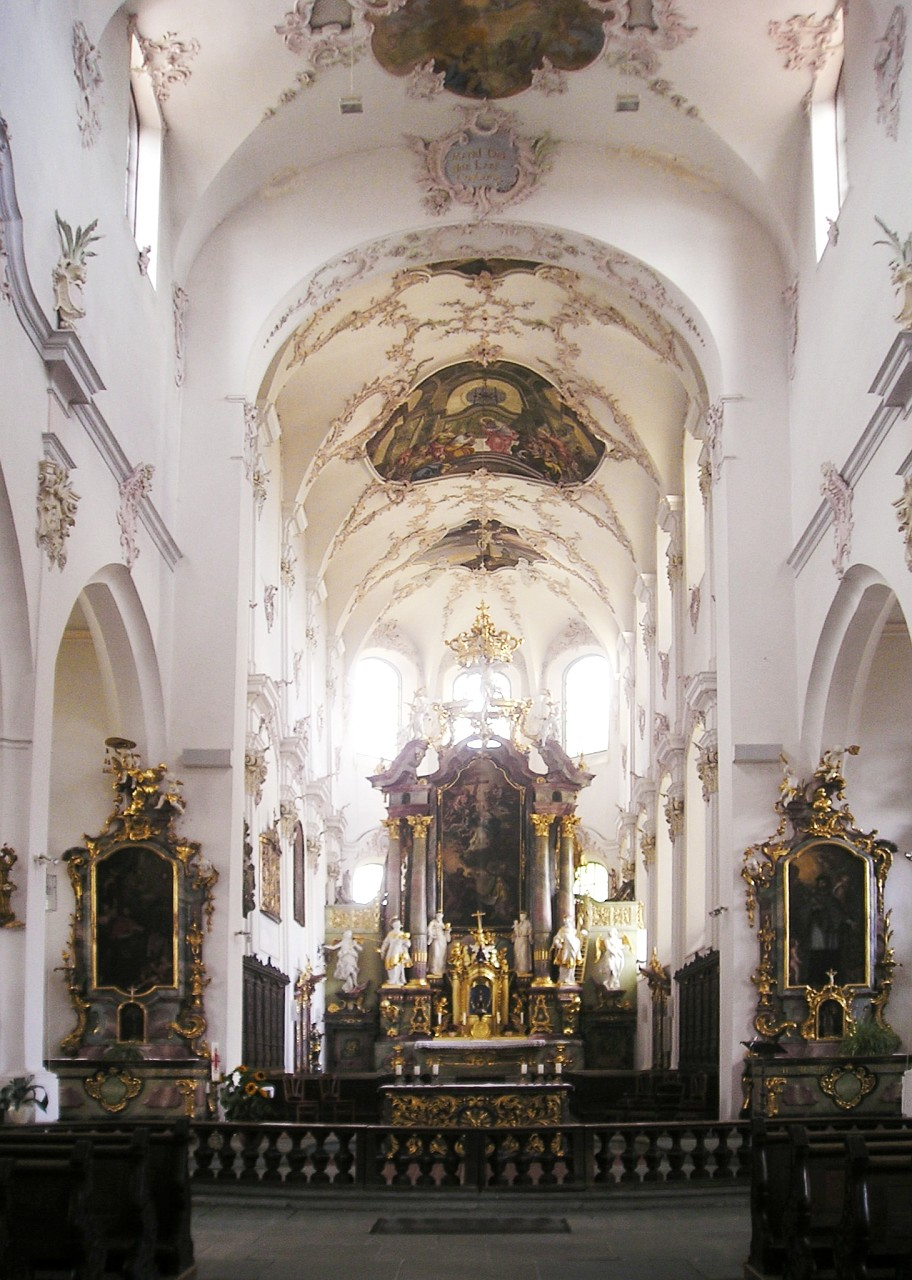
Interior of the Franziskanerkirche in Überlingen, with high altar by J. A. Feuchtmayer

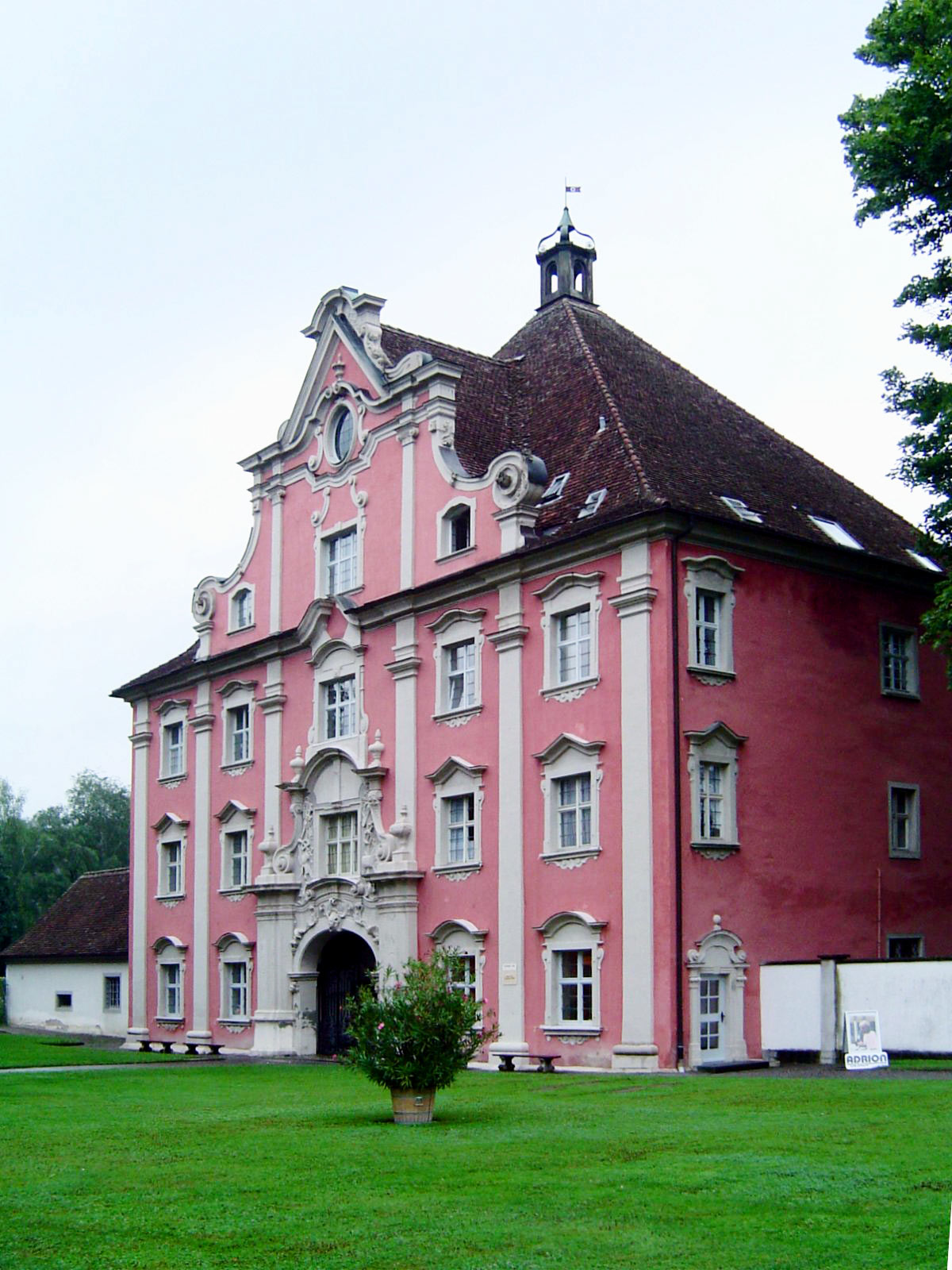
Unteres Tor, erected 1735 after plans by architect Lorenz Rüscher, with stucco decorations by J. A. Feuchtmayer (Salem, Bodensee, Germany)

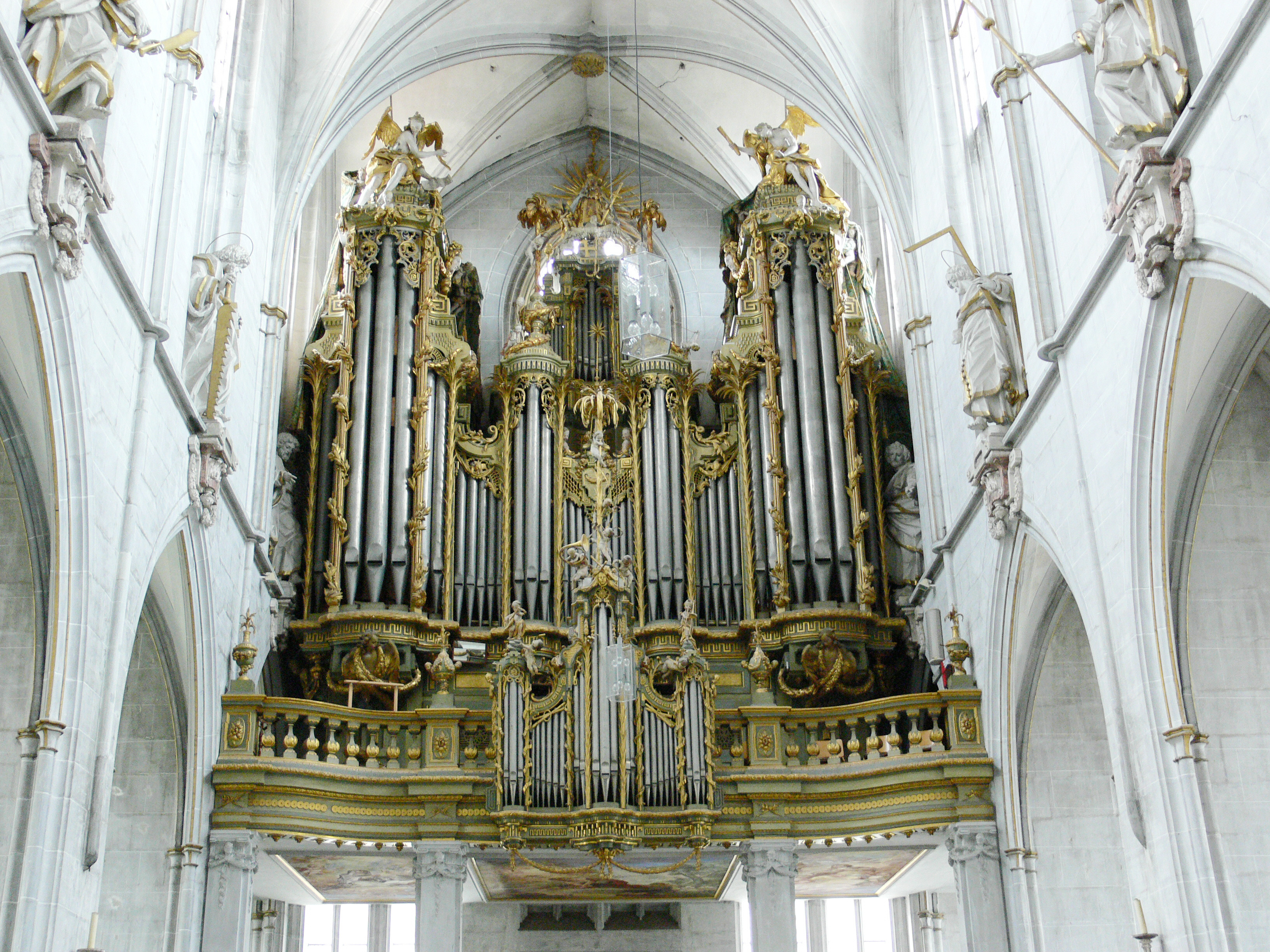
Organ in the Salem Abbey

== Gallery of Works by Franz Xaver Feuchtmayer (the Elder) ==
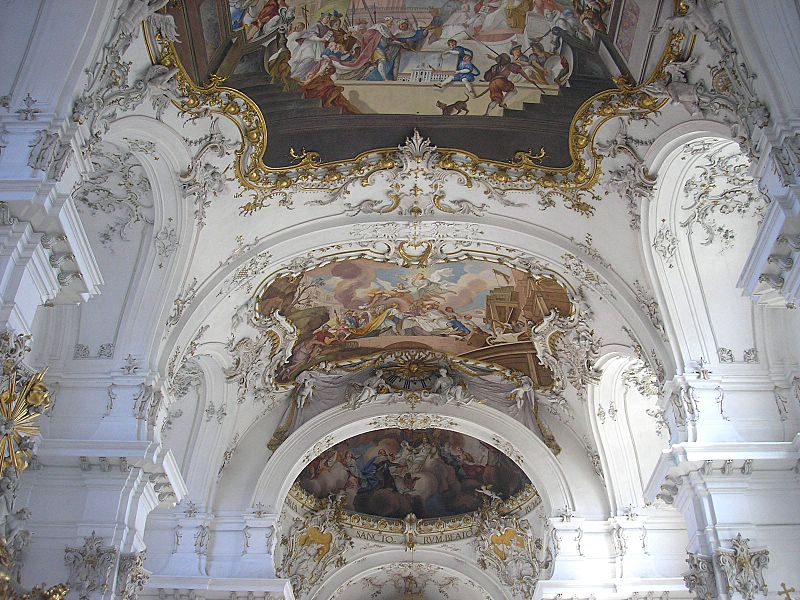
Stucco by F. X. Feuchtmayer and J. M. Feuchtmayer in the Church of St. Maria in Dießen am Ammersee

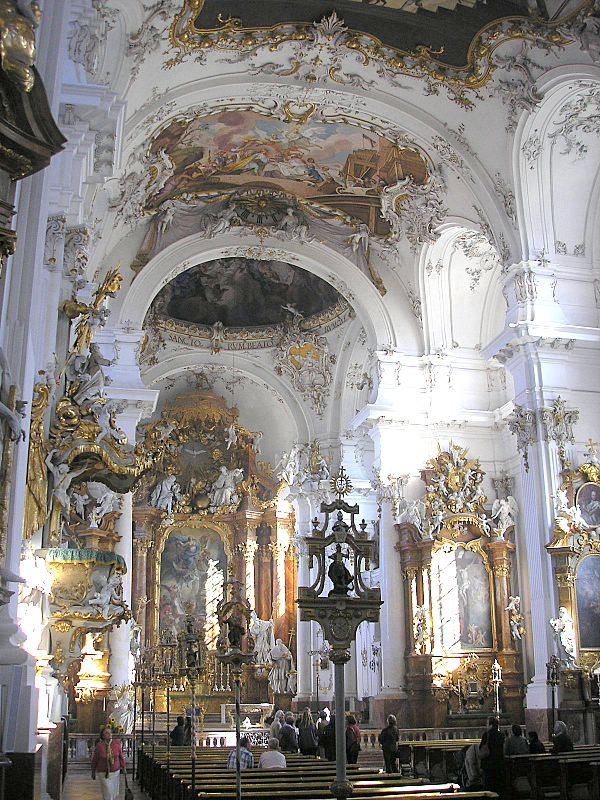
Interior of Church of St. Maria in Dießen am Ammersee

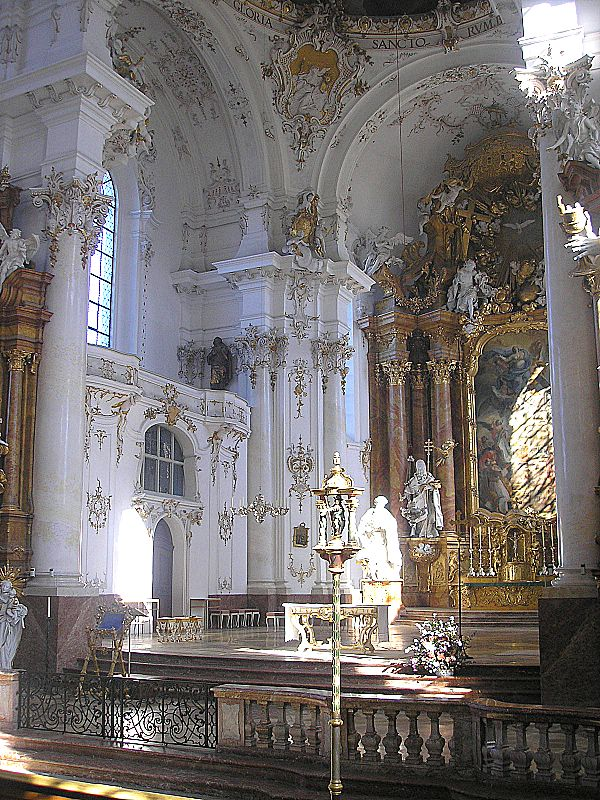
Choir of Church of St. Maria in Dießen am Ammersee

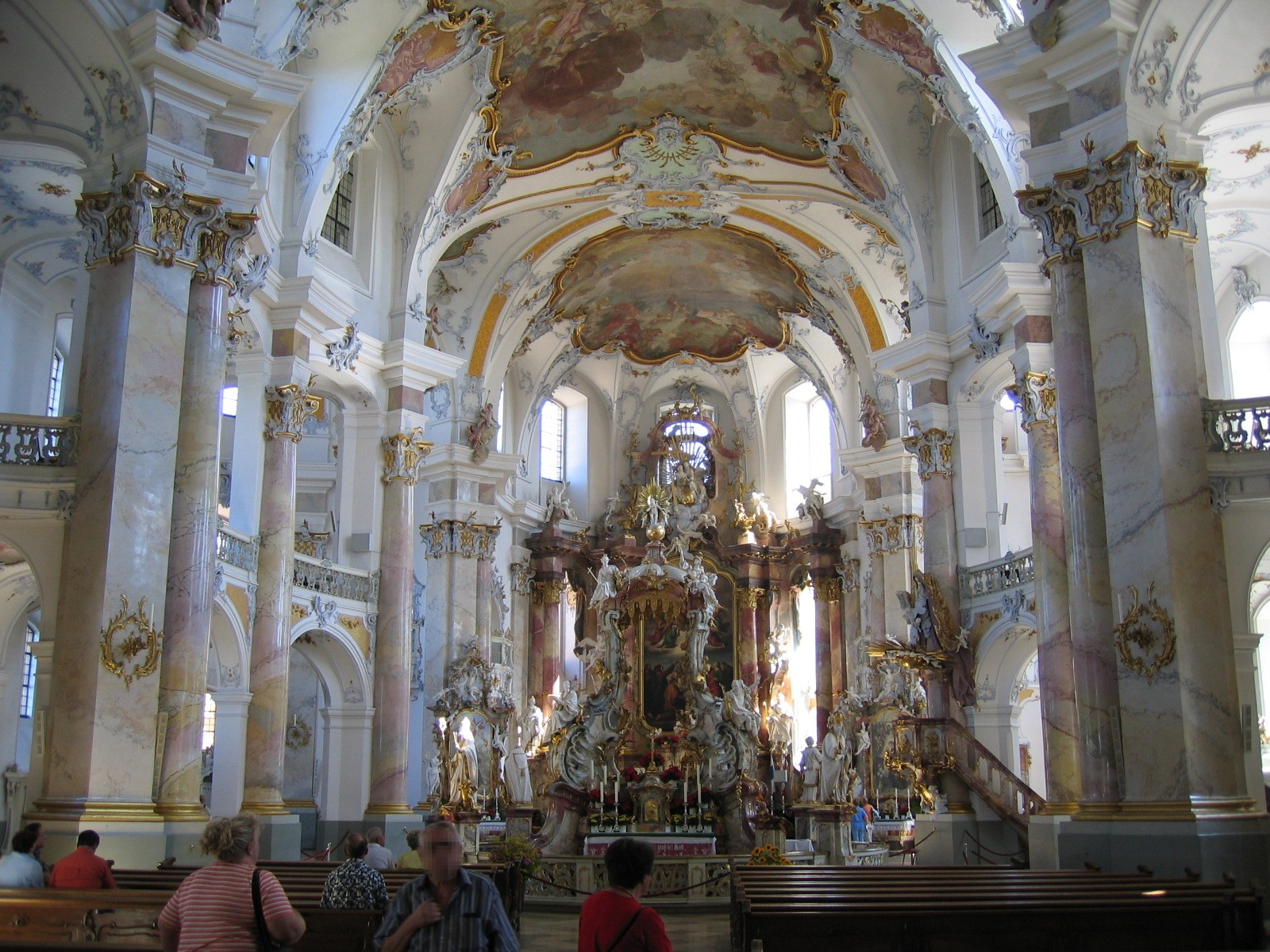
Interior of the Pilgrimage Church of Vierzehnheiligen in Bad Staffelstein, with stucco work by F. X. Freuchtmayer

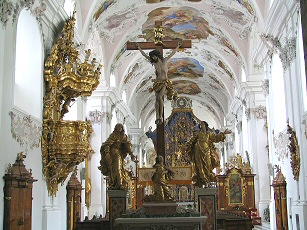
Interior of the Monastery Church of Mariae Himmelfahrt in Stams

== Gallery of Works by Johann Michael Feuchtmayer (the Younger) ==
J. M. Feuchtmayer also did work with his brother Franz Xaver that is shown above.

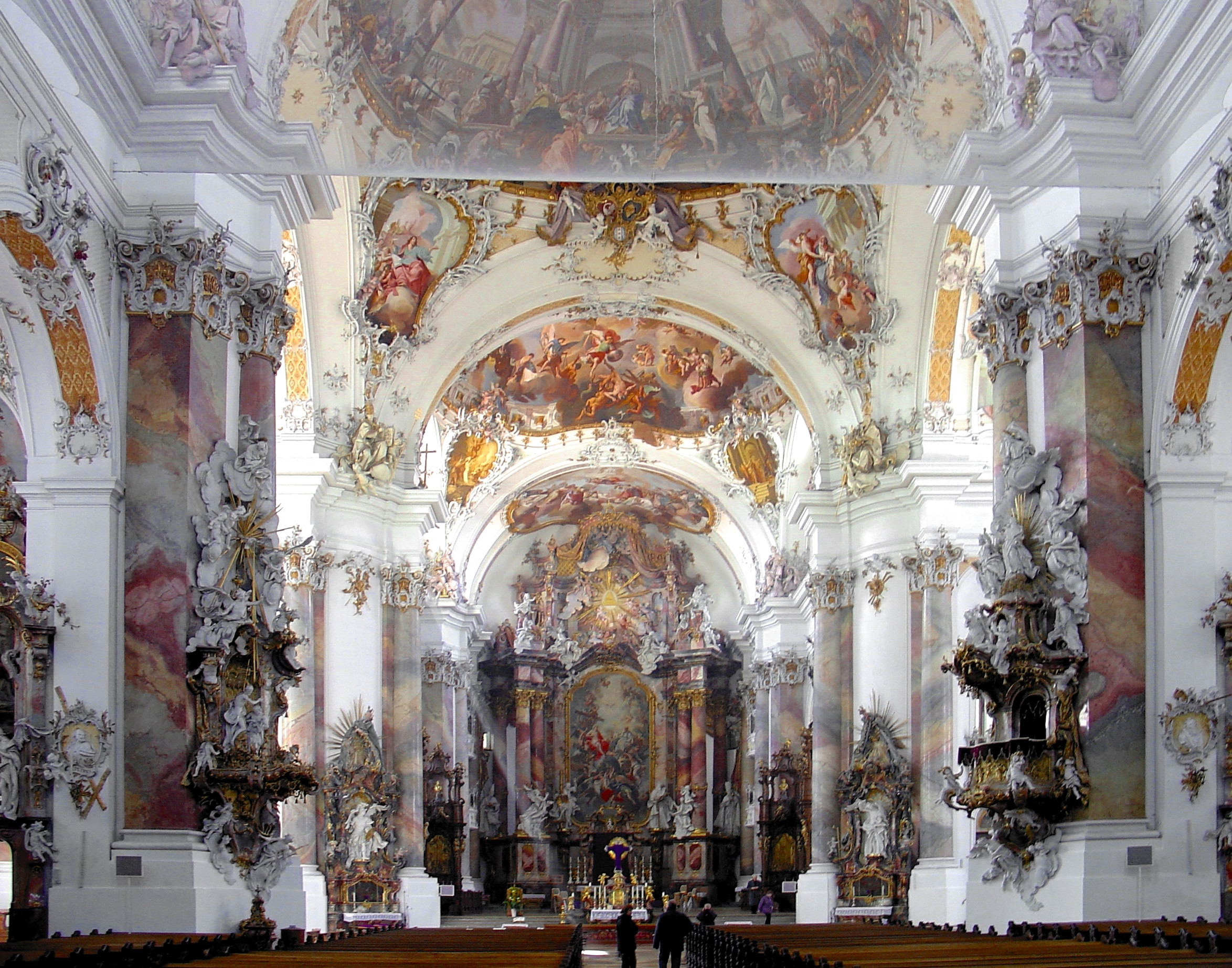
Interior of Ottobeuren Abbey

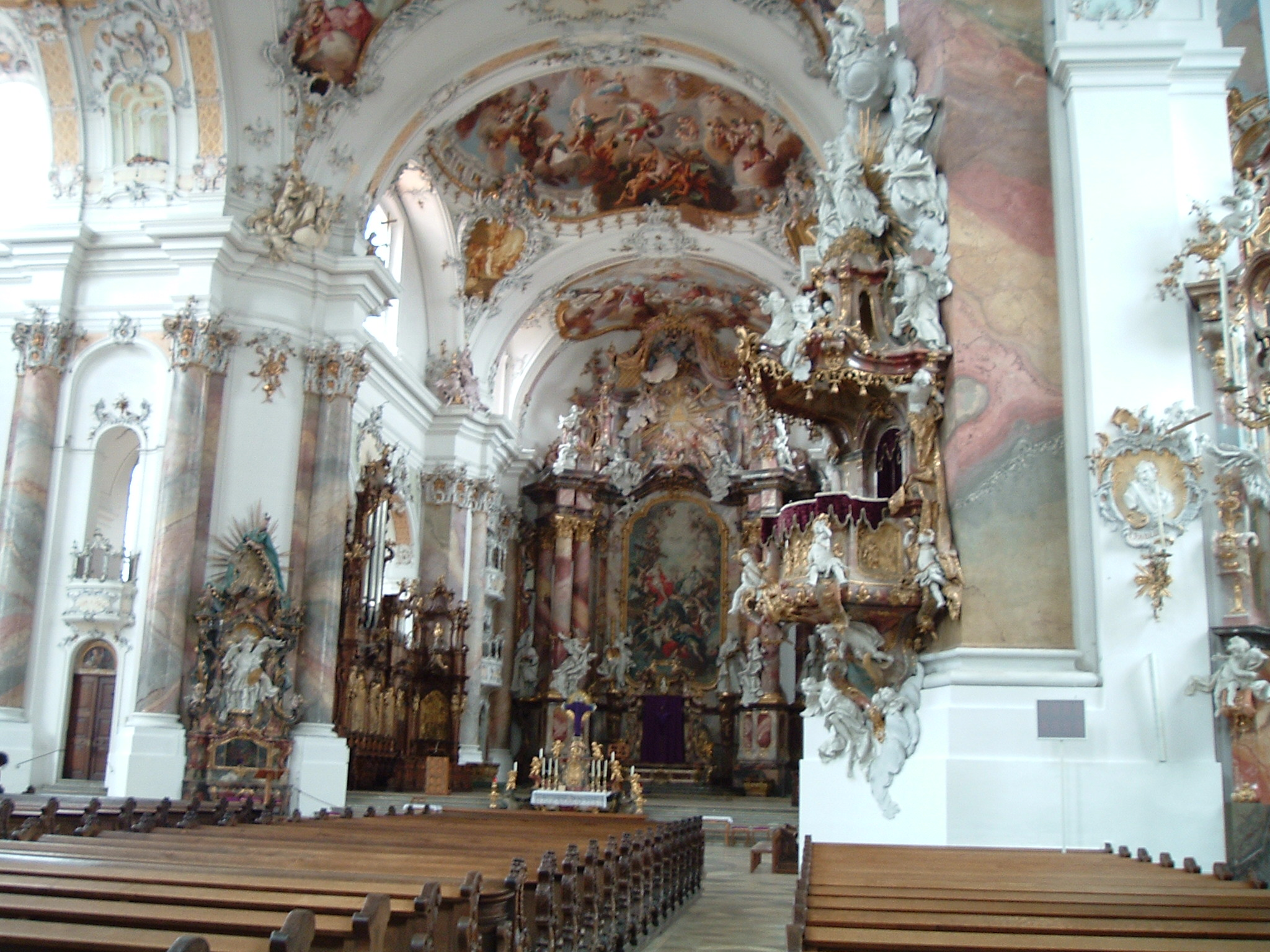
Another view of the stucco of Ottobeuren Abbey

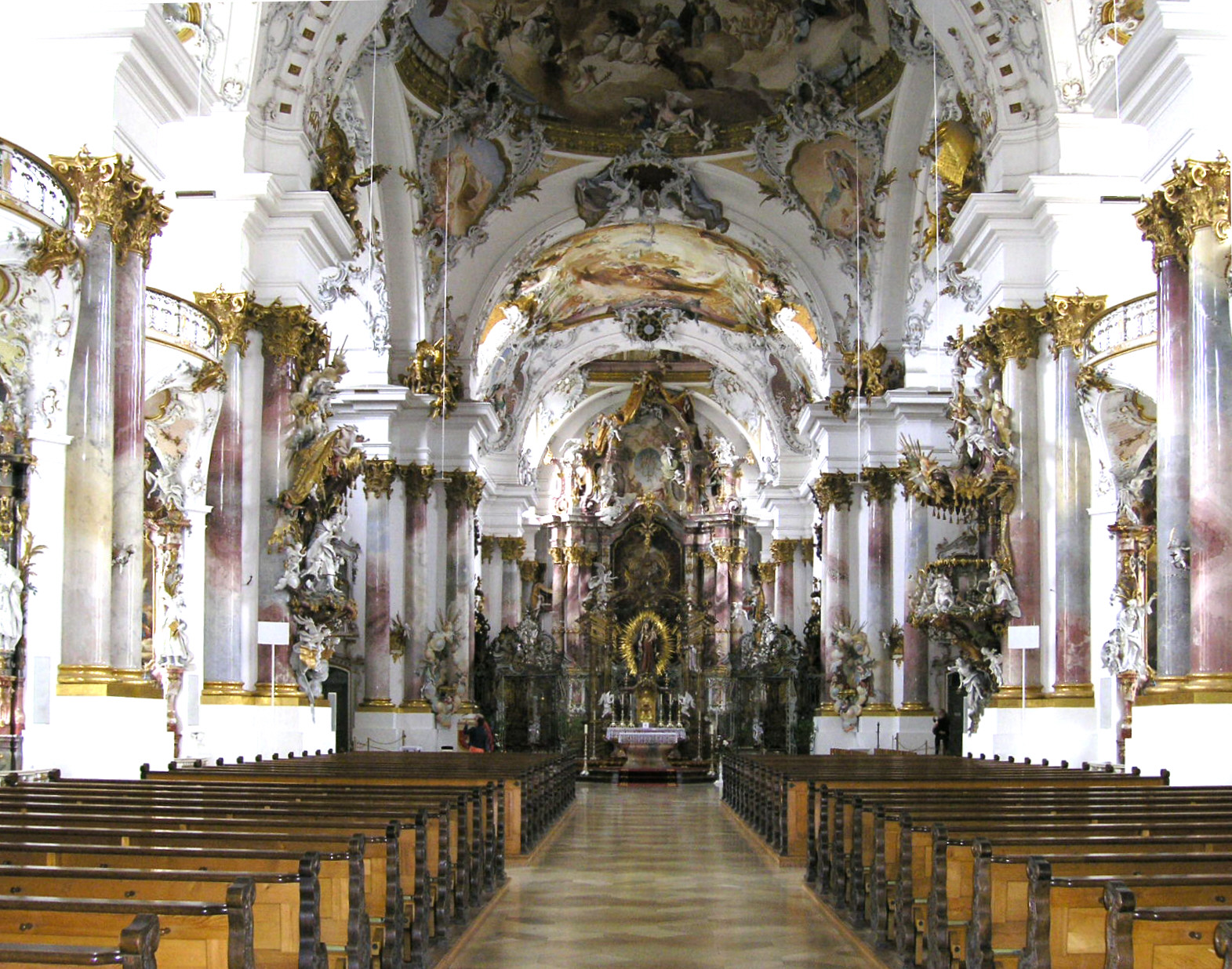
Zwiefalten Abbey stucco

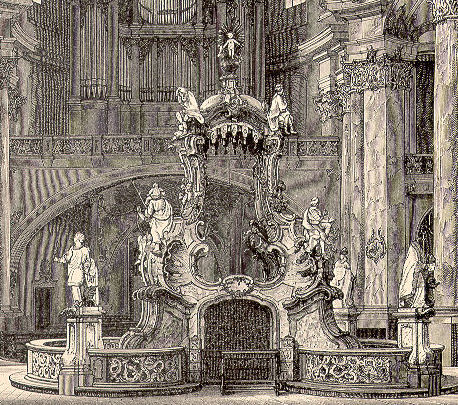
1891 drawing showing the stucco on the Gnadenaltar of the Pilgrimage Church of Vierzehnheiligen in Bad Staffelstein

== Gallery of Works by Franz Xaver Feuchtmayer (the Younger) ==
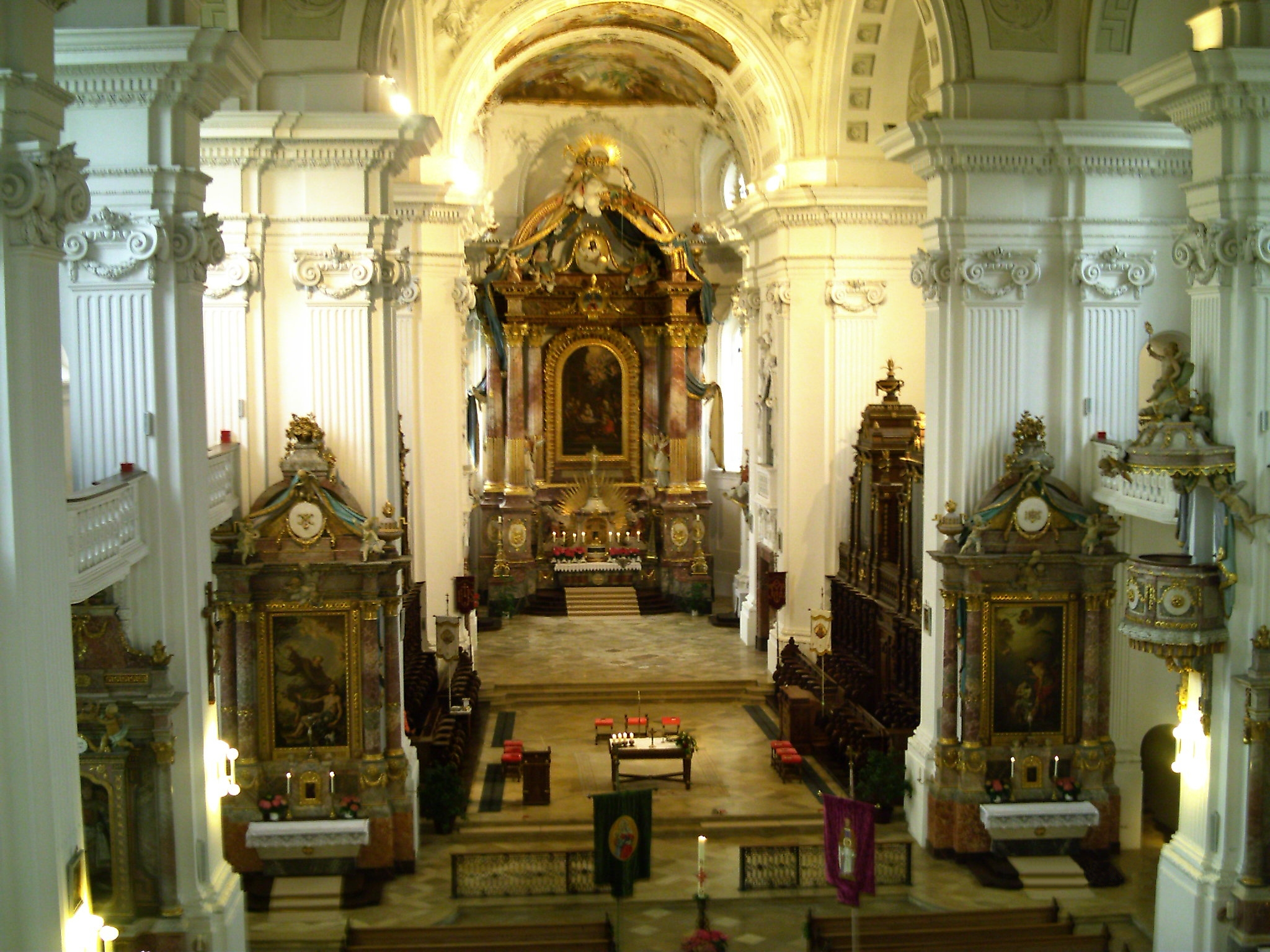
High altar and side altars in the Premonstratensian Monastery Church of St. Maria and St. Verena in Rot an der Rot Abbey
