= Franz Xaver Feuchtmayer =

German sculptor (1698–1763)

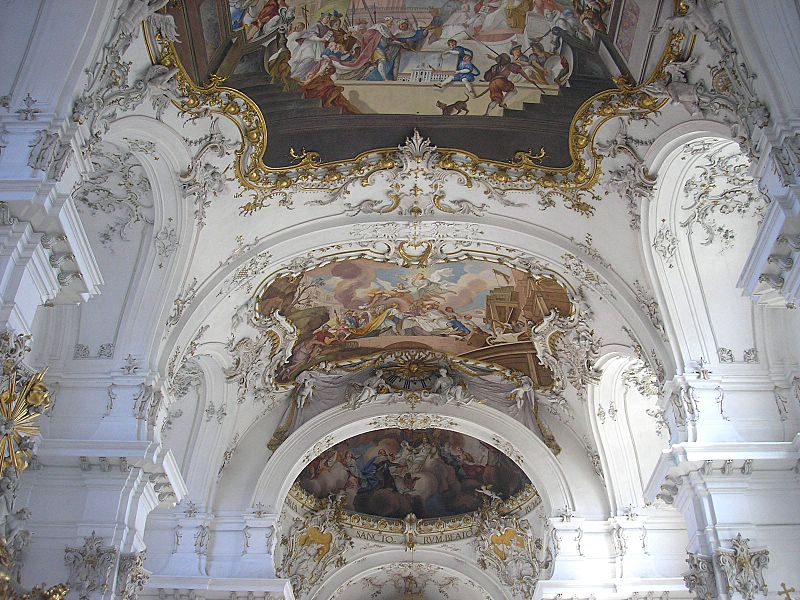
Stucco by F. X. Feuchtmayer and J. M. Feuchtmayer in the Church of St. Maria in Dießen am Ammersee

Franz Xaver Feuchtmayer (the Elder) (1698–1763) was a German Baroque stucco plasterer of the Wessobrunner School.

Feuchtmayer was born in Wessobrunn, Bavaria. A member of the famous Feuchtmayer family, he was the son of Michael Feuchtmayer (b. 1667); the nephew of Franz Joseph Feuchtmayer (1660–1718) and Johann Michael Feuchtmayer (the Elder) (1666–1713); the older brother of Johann Michael Feuchtmayer (the Younger) (1709–1772); the cousin of Joseph Anton Feuchtmayer (1696–1770); and the father of Franz Xaver Feuchtmayer (the Younger) (b. 1735).

Feuchtmayer worked alongside his brother, Johann Michael Fischer, Matthäus Günther, and Ignaz Günther to create some of the most famous churches in Bavaria and Tyrol. His style has been variously described as "lavish," "delicate," and "vigorous."

== Major works ==
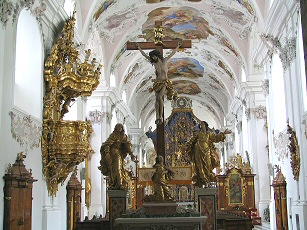
Interior stucco design of the Monastery Church of Mariae Himmelfahrt in Stams, Austria

=== Bavaria ===
- Augsburg—Dominican Church of St. Magdalena (1721–1724)
- Augsburg—Schaezler Palais (1764)
- Dießen am Ammersee—Church of St. Maria (completed 1739)
- Dießen am Ammersee—Church of St. Georgen (1750)
- Ellingen—Castle Church
- Freising—Neustift Monastery Church (1765)
- Indersdorf—Augustinian Canonry (1755)
- Rott am Inn—Benedictine Abbey Church of St. Marinus and St. Anianus (dome frescoes and other frescoes) (1763)
- Steinbach—Pilgrimage Church of St. Maria (1764)
- Staffelstein—Pilgrimage Church of Vierzehnheiligen

=== Tyrol ===
- Fiecht—Collegiate Church of St. Josef (1740–1744)
- Innsbruck—Wilten Basilica (1754)
- Stams—Monastery Church of Mariae Himmelfahrt
