= Johann Michael Feuchtmayer the Elder =

German painter and engraver

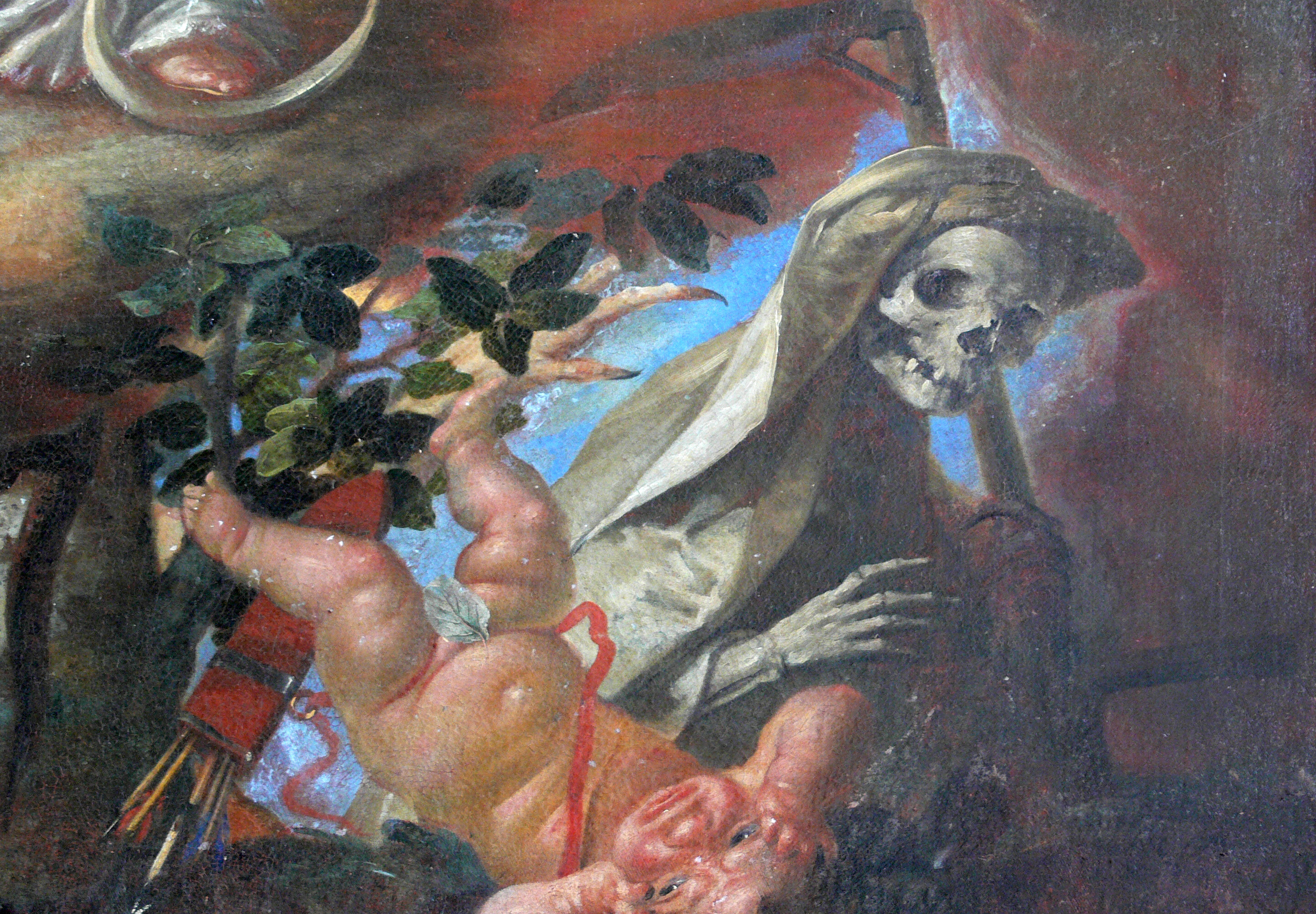
detail of Immaculata by Johann Michael Feuchtmayer the Elder; Cupid falls into the depths, Death turns away, painted in the sanctuary of the Our Lady of Mount Carmel church in Meersburg, Lake Constance

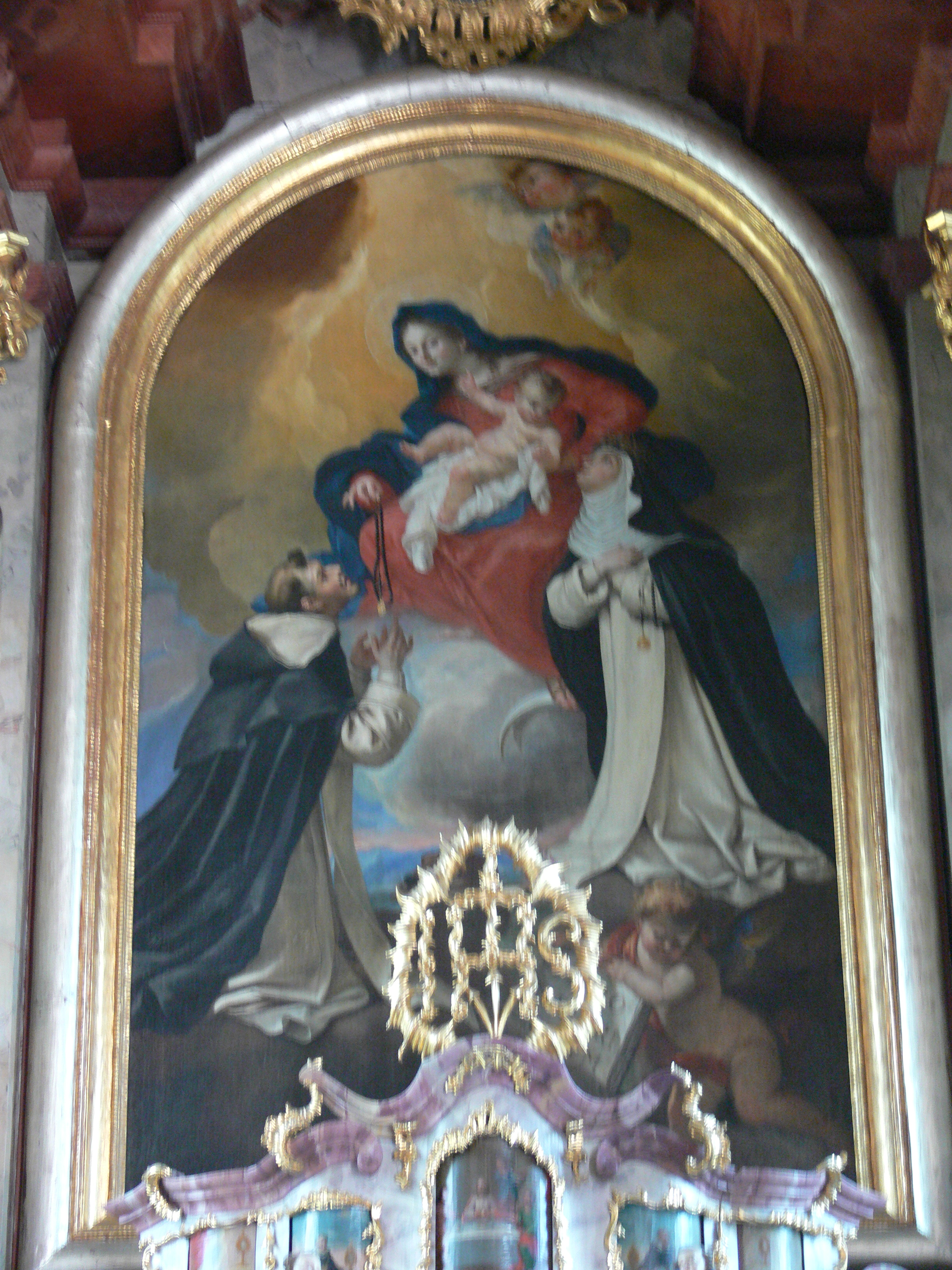
Handover of the rosary to Saint Dominikus and Saint Catherine of Siena

Johann Michael Feuchtmayer the Elder (17 April 1666 (baptism) – 15 October 1713) was a German painter and copper engraver.

== Life and work ==
He was born in Wessobrunn, into the famous Feuchtmayer family of Baroque artists associated with the Wessobrunner School.

He was the brother of Franz Joseph Feuchtmayer (1660–1718) and Michael Feuchtmayer (b. 1667); the uncle of Joseph Anton Feuchtmayer (1696–1770), Franz Xaver Feuchtmayer (the Elder) (1705–1764), and Johann Michael Feuchtmayer (the Younger) (1709–1772); and the great-uncle of Franz Xaver Feuchtmayer (the Younger) (b. 1735).

J. M. Feuchtmayer is most famous for the 1706 high altar paintings in the Catholic Parish Church of St. Idda in Bauen, Switzerland. With his brother Franz Joseph, he was also responsible for the choir stalls in the Benedictine monastery church in Einsiedeln, Switzerland. He died in Konstanz.
