= Joseph Anton Feuchtmayer =

German sculptor (1696–1770)

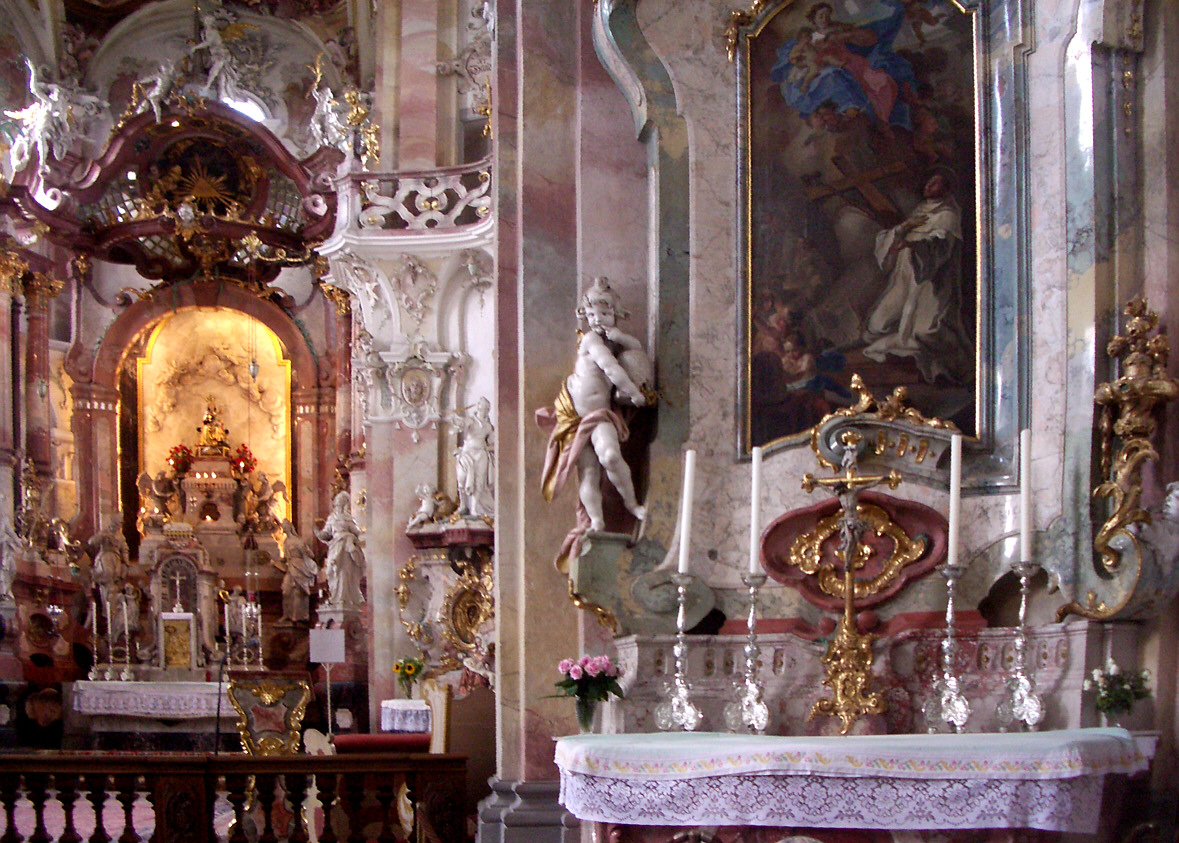
Interior view of the Wallfahrtskirche Birnau with J. A. Feuchtmayer's famous "Honigschlecker" putto (center) in Überlingen, Germany

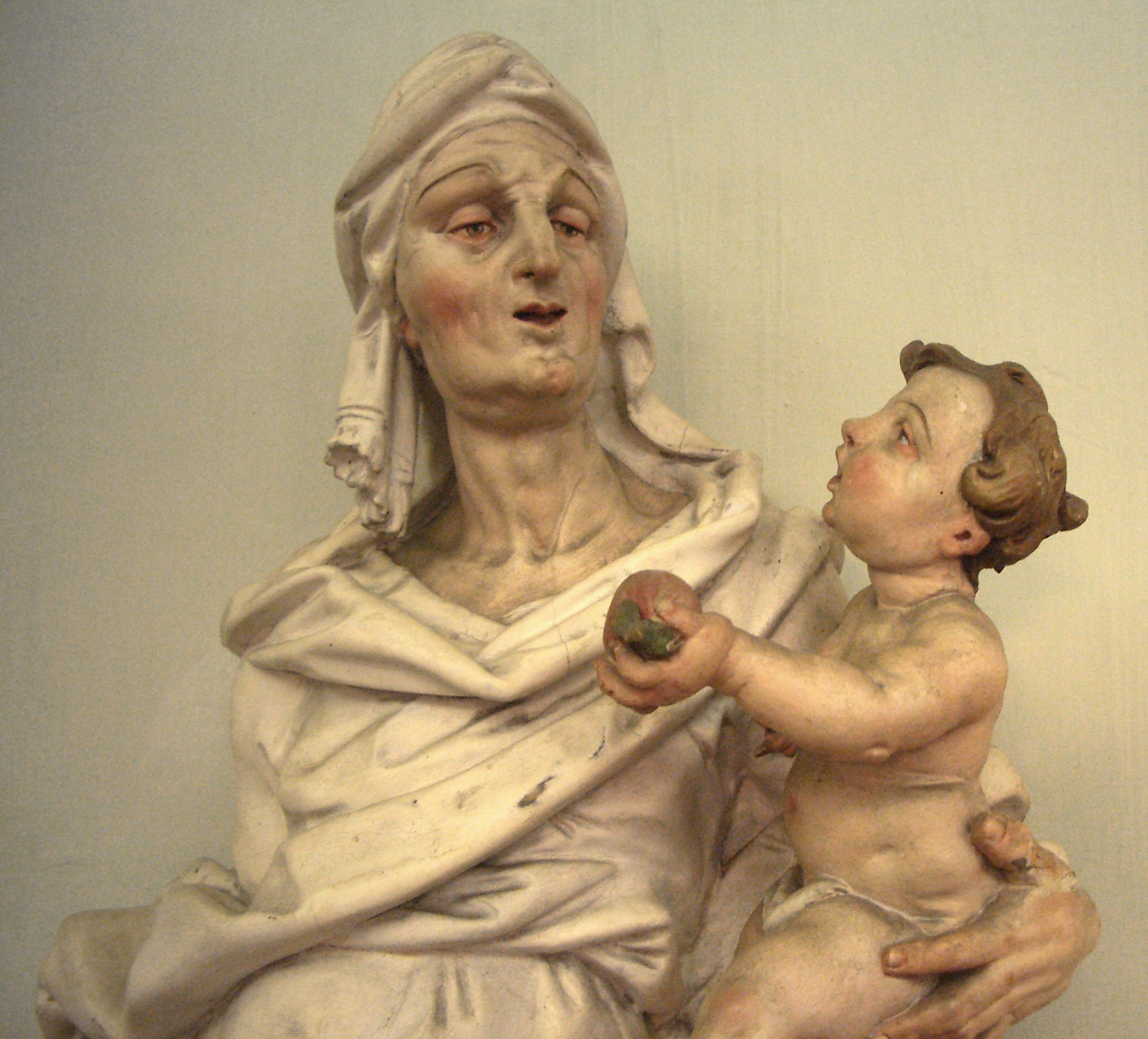
St. Anna Selbdritt (1750), detail (Stadtmuseum in Überlingen, Germany)

Joseph Anton Feuchtmayer (baptized 6 March 1696 – 2 January 1770) was an important Rococo stuccoist and sculptor, active in southern Germany and Switzerland. He dominated artistic production in the region around Lake Constance with his work for churches and monasteries.

== Life ==
J. A. Feuchtmayer was born in Linz, to Franz Joseph Feuchtmayer (1660–1718) and Maria Theresa Holstein.

A member of the famous Feuchtmayer family of the Wessobrunner School, he was the nephew of Johann Michael Feuchtmayer the Elder and Michael Feuchtmayer (b. 1667); the first cousin of Franz Xaver Feuchtmayer (the Elder) (1705–1764) and Johann Michael Feuchtmayer (the Younger) (1709–1772); and the first cousin once removed of Franz Xaver Feuchtmayer the Younger (b. 1735).

Joseph Anton was first apprenticed to his father, than began studying sculpture in Augsburg in 1715 under the Italian stuccoist Diego Francesco Carlone, with whom he worked in Weingarten. From Carlone, he learned the production techniques for creating the stucco figures with highly polished surfaces that would make Feuchtmayer famous.

After the death of his father Franz Joseph in 1718, he took over his father's workshop in Mimmenhausen. At the same time, he became the "house sculptor" of the Cistercian Salem Abbey, delivering for them his first commission, the organ case for the Salemer Münster.

In 1728-1729 he did stucco work in the Church of the Holy Ghost, Bern. In 1732, he decorated the rebuilt abbey church of Einsiedeln Abbey using the scagliola technique. Alongside such notable artists as Franz Joseph Spiegler, Feuchtmayer worked for the most part on the Baroque monastic churches along the Upper Swabian Baroque Route. It was at Zwiefalten Abbey, around 1744, that he taught the sculptor, Johann Joseph Christian to work with stucco. His most well-known work is the putto on the Bernhardsaltar in Birnau called the "Honigschlecker" ("honey eater"), a reference St. Bernard's rhetorical gift.

In 1762, he provided choir stalls, confessionals and side altars for St. Gallen Cathedral.

Feuchtmayer's house and workshop in Mimmenhausen, near Salem, Bodensee, where he died, are now a museum dedicated to the life and work of the artist.

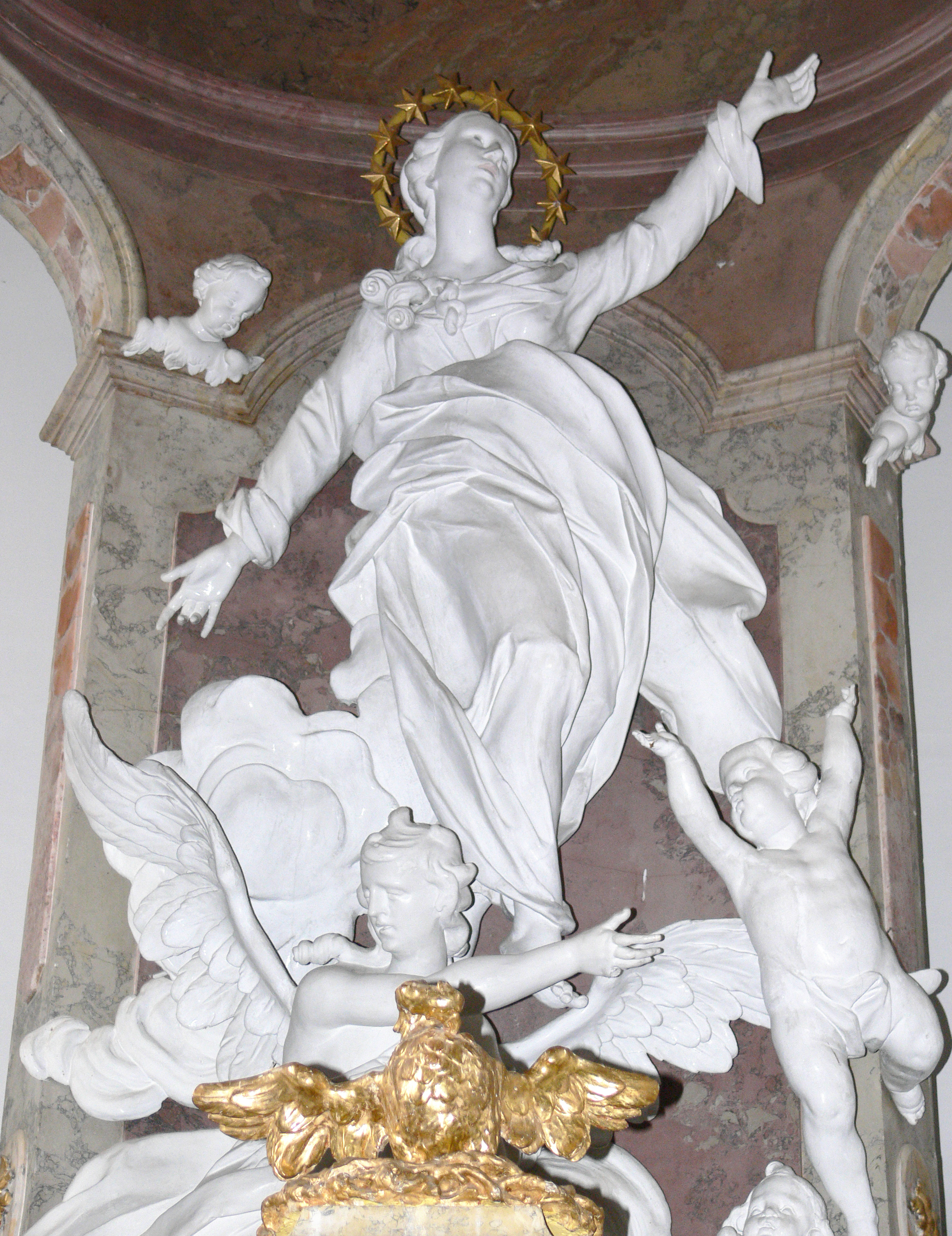
The high altar group at Zeil, near Leutkirch im Allgäu, 1763-64

== Major works ==
- Beuron—Benedictine Abbey of St. Martin and St. Maria (high altar)
- Meersburg—Chapel in the Neues Schloss (stucco)
- St. Peter im Schwarzwald (sculptures on pillars, Apostle figures on altars)
- Salem Abbey (four confessionals, organ case)
- parish church of St Martin in Seefelden (confessionals)
- Uhldingen-Mühlhofen— Cistercian Priory of Birnau (window frames, Maria Immaculata, stucco, statue, altars, pulpit, altar figures, stations of the cross)
- Überlingen—Franziskanerkirche (high altar)
- Weingarten—Benedictine Monastery of St. Martin of Tours and St. Oswald (choir stalls)
- Bad Wurzach—Catholic Parish Church of St. Verena (figures on high altar)
- Zeil, near Leutkirch im Allgäu—Catholic Parish Church of Mariä Himmelfahrt (high altar)
