= Franz Joseph Feuchtmayer =

German sculptor (1660–1718)

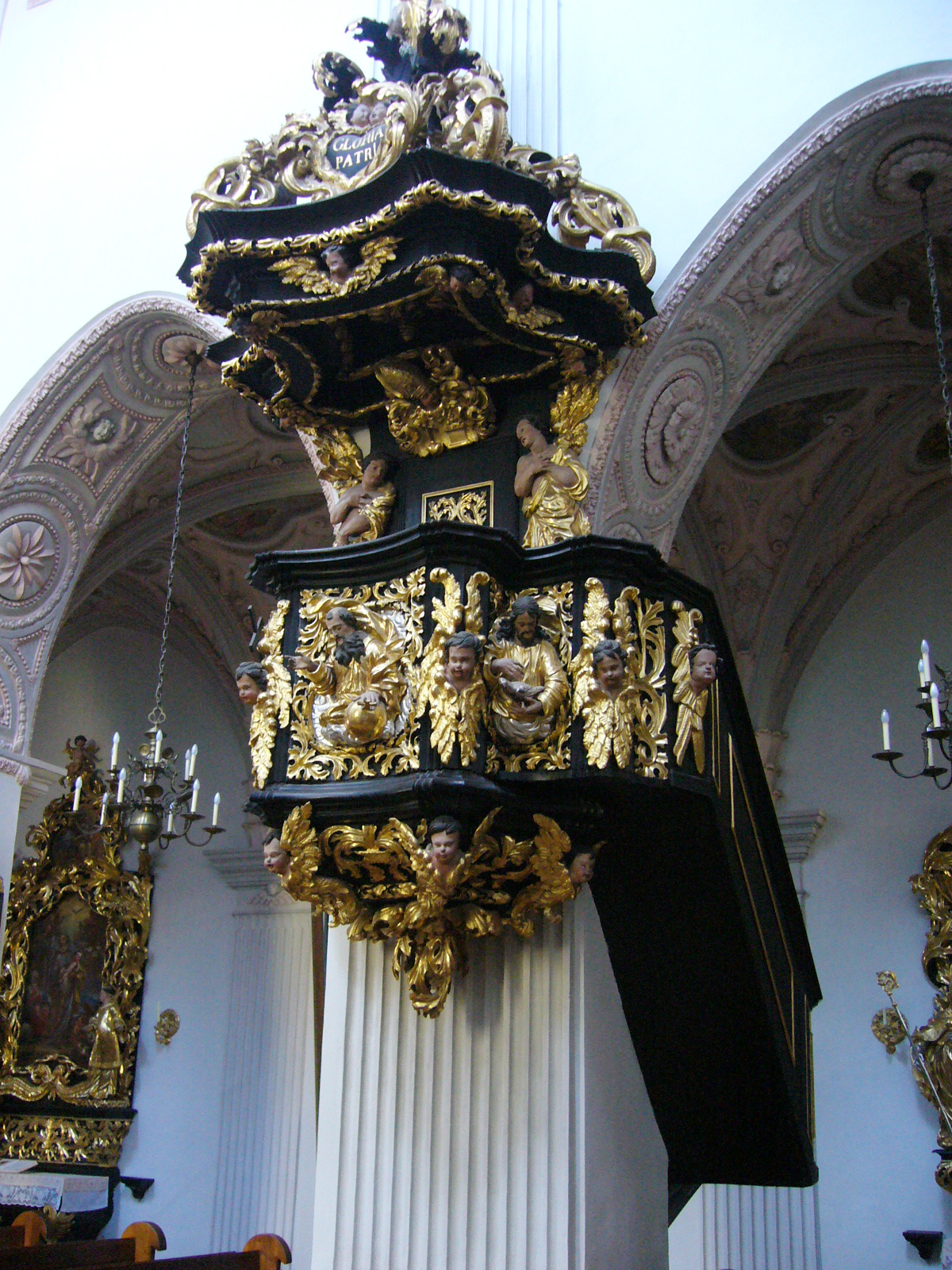
Pulpit by F. J. Feuchtmayer in the Parish Church of St. Maria in Seitenstetten, Austria

Franz Joseph Feuchtmayer (baptized 9 March 1660 – 25 December 1718) was a member of the German Feuchtmayer family of Baroque artists of the Wessobrunner School.

Feuchtmayer was born in Wessobrunn Abbey. A sculptor and stuccoist, he (along with his brother Johann Michael) was responsible for the choir stalls in the Benedictine monastery church in Einsiedeln, Switzerland, and for the sculptures on the altars and pulpits in the Parish Church of St. Maria in Seitenstetten, Austria. He also assisted in the rebuilding of the Salem Abbey, including sculpted decoration in the minster, destroyed in a fire in 1697. He died in Mimmenhausen (near Salem, Bodensee).

He was the brother of Johann Michael Feuchtmayer (the Elder) and Michael Feuchtmayer (b. 1667); the father of Joseph Anton Feuchtmayer (1696–1770); the uncle of Franz Xaver Feuchtmayer (the Elder) (1705–1764) and Johann Michael Feuchtmayer (the Younger) (1709–1772); and the great-uncle of Franz Xaver Feuchtmayer (the Younger) (1735–1803).
