= Johann Michael Fischer =

German architect (1692–1766)

- Born: February 18, 1692; Burglengenfeld, Germany
- Died: May 6, 1766 (aged 74); Munich, Germany
- Resting place: Munich Frauenkirche, Munich, Germany
- Occupation: Architect

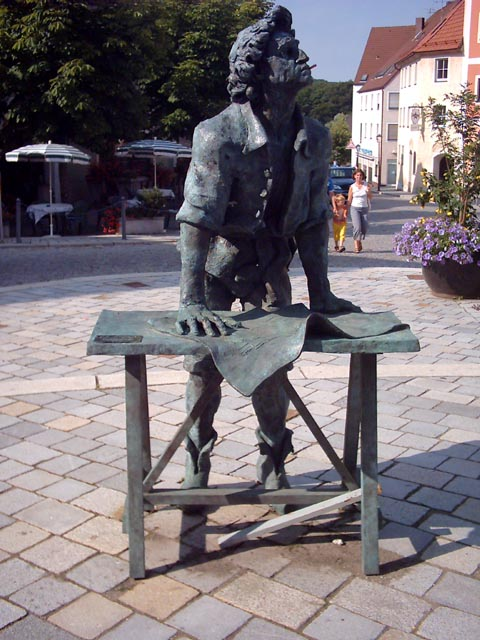
A statue of Johann Michael Fischer in Burglengenfeld commemorates his birthplace

Johann Michael Fischer (18 February 1692 – 6 May 1766) was a German architect in the late Baroque period.

Fischer was born in Burglengenfeld, Upper Palatinate. He is a major representative of south German Baroque architects. He studied in Bohemia and combined Bohemian elements with Bavarian Baroque traditions. He often co-operated with the most gifted Bavarian artists of his time, such as Cosmas Damian Asam and Egid Quirin Asam, Johann Joseph Christian, Johann Michael Feuchtmayer, Matthäus Günther, Ignaz Günther, Franz Joseph Spiegler, Johann Baptist Straub, and Johann Baptist Zimmermann.

Fischer died, aged 74, in Munich, and is buried in the Munich Frauenkirche.

== Main works ==
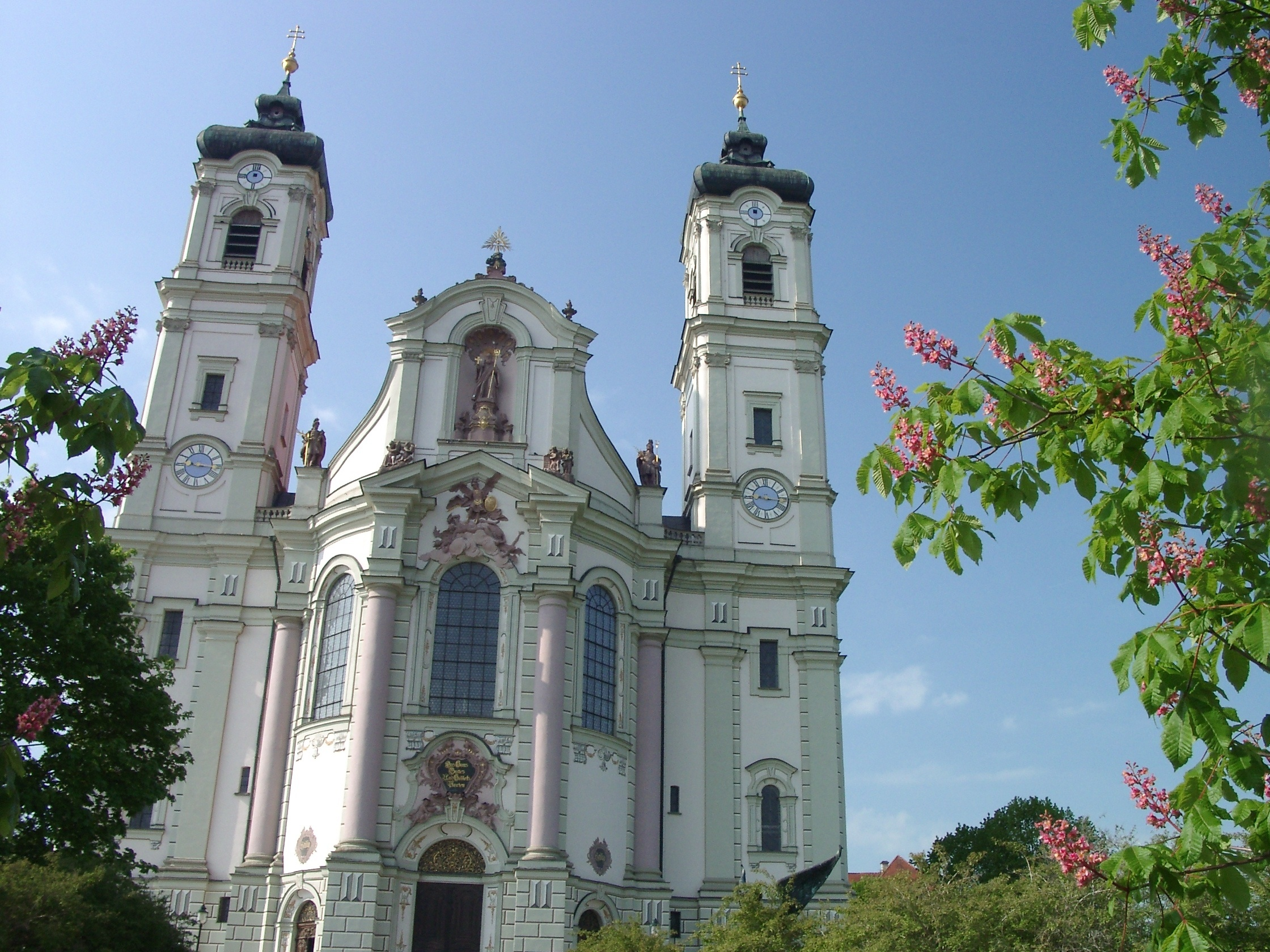
The façade of Ottobeuren Abbey

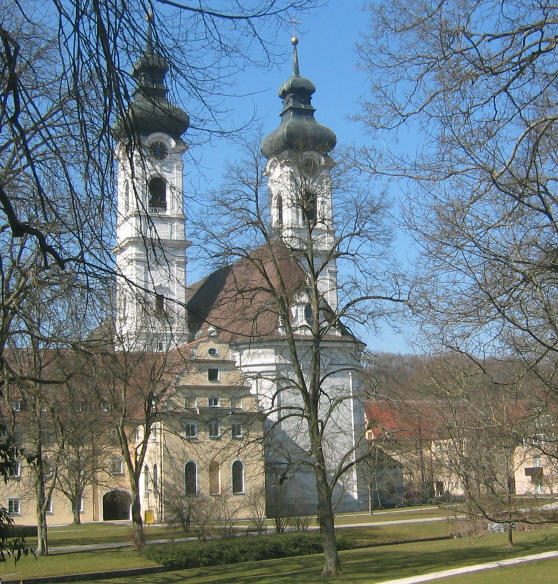
Exterior of Zwiefalten Abbey

Fischer designed 32 churches and 23 monasteries in southern Germany. Among these, the best-known are the following.

=== Bavaria ===
- Aufhausen—Pilgrimage Church of Maria Schnee (1736–1751)
- Benediktbeuern—Anastasia Chapel in the Church of St. Benedikt (1750–1758), considered a jewel of Baroque architecture
- Dießen am Ammersee—Church of St. Maria (completed 1739)
- Fürstenzell—Church of the Ascension of the Blessed Virgin (completed 1728)
- Munich—Franciscan Monastery Church of St. Anna im Lehel (consecrated 1737)
- Munich—Parish Church of St. Michael (1737–1752)
- Niederalteich—Benedictine Monastery of St. Mauritius (first commission for Fischer) (1724–1726)
- Osterhofen Abbey—Papal Basilica of St. Margaretha (1727–1740)
- Ottobeuren—Benedictine Monastery Church of the Holy Trinity (1737–1766), considered one of the most magnificent churches of the Baroque era
- Rott am Inn—Benedictine Abbey Church of St. Marinus and St. Anianus (1759–1767)

=== Baden-Württemberg ===
- Kisslegg—Neues Schloss (New Castle) (1721–1727)
- Wiblingen Abbey—Benedictine Monastery Church of St. Martin (1714–1783), built by Johann Georg Specht based on designs by Fischer
- Zwiefalten—Zwiefalten Abbey (1741–1747), considered a model of integrated Baroque design

== Disputed works ==
Several works have been attributed to Fischer that are now disputed, although his style was an obvious influence:

- Erling-Andechs—Pilgrimage Church Mariae Verkündiging and Monastery
- Haigerloch—Pilgrimage Church of St. Anne
- Murnau—Parish Church of St. Nikolaus
