= Senta Dinglreiter =

Senta Dinglreiter (31 March 1893 – 14 April 1969) was a German writer. She was a convinced National Socialist and in the 1930s and 1940s mainly wrote travelogues and novels about the former German colonies.

== Life ==
Dinglreiter was born in 1893 in Fürstenzell in Lower Bavaria. She grew up on a farm and while already in her youth she wanted to travel the world, she had to help out at her family farm and had little access to formal education. At the age of 19, she moved to Munich and began an apprenticeship as a cook. She started to do photography in order to be able to finance travelling and also tried opening a photography studio in Munich. In 1925, she traveled to the United States and stayed several months in New York, Chicago and Denver. She worked as a secretary in an engineering company in Chicago and as a maid in Denver. Afterwards she continued traveling to Thailand, Vietnam and Cambodia.

She entered the Nazi Party on 9 August 1926, several years before Adolf Hitler's rise to power. She gave speeches about her travels in Africa for the Nazi party and wrote for the Nazi magazines SA-Mann and Der völkische Beobachter.

Her first travelogue was published in 1932, Deutsches Mädel fährt um die Welt ("German girl travels around the world"). After traveling to former German colonies in preparation for the book Wann kommen die Deutschen endlich wieder? ("When are the Germans finally coming back?"), which was published in 1935, she focused on writing pro-colonial literature. In 1938, she travelled to New Guinea, which served as an inspiration for her book So sah ich unsere Südsee ("This is how I saw our South Sea").

After World War II, her books were included in a list of prohibited literature ("Liste der auszusondernden Literatur") by the occupation forces. In the 1950s, she resumed publishing travel reports, but also especially novels in the Heimatroman genre depicting farm life in rural Bavaria. She died in 1969 in Munich. Her urn was transferred to a cemetery in her home municipality Fürstenzell on the 40th anniversary of her death. Fürstenzell named a street after her.

== Themes ==
Many of Dinglreiter's texts are seen as representatives of German colonial literature. Several of her books are travelogues of former German colonies in Africa and Asia, among them Wann kommen die Deutschen endlich wieder? (1935), Ein Mädel reist durch Afrika (1935) and So sah ich unsere Südsee (1939). The novel Deutsche Frau in Afrika (1940, "German woman in Africa") describes the perspective of a Bavarian woman in German South West Africa and German East Africa between 1913 and 1938.

Joseph Kebe-Nguema writes that with her propagandist works she tried to reinstate Germany's reputation as a colonial power by justifying colonial claims and painting Germany as a "better" colonial power than France and Britain. The title of her travelogue Wann kommen die Deutschen endlich wieder? ("When are the Germans finally coming back?") is a reference to this. Colonial subjects would long to be under German colonial rule, because Germans were "born colonialists" and had ruled with a "humane, tight and just treatment" of its indigenous populations.

It was important to Dinglreiter to emphasize the role of white German women in the colonial project. She depicts white German women metaphorically as the projection of German men who are longing for a sense of "home" ("Heimat") in the colonies. In Deutsche Frau in Afrika she writes: "The white woman was honoured as a goddess in the colonies." Women in the novel, as usual in female colonial literature, are depicted as brave characters that resist traditional gender norms for example by hunting, joining the colonial military (Schutztruppe) for preserving the nation ("Volksgemeinschaft") and fight against sexism. Often in female colonial novels including Dinglreiter's, women are empowered to be brave by men, win the recognition of men and are getting married by the end.

In many texts she positioned herself as a convinced racist, antisemite and national socialist, for example in this quote from 1939: "A silver swastika that the boy was wearing on the fishing net on his back was blinking. Didn't I have to follow this sign with lots of joy and wasn't it wondrous when I screamed out of joy in the great tropical morning?" She discriminates against Jewish, Black and indigenous people, but also against Chinese and communists. Indigenous people in her works are depicted as "childish" along colonial racist ideologies. Often, indigenous people are described as cannibals. Kebe-Nguema writes that Black men are framed as a danger for white women, influenced by the racist campaign Black Horror on the Rhine. Jewish people are seen as a danger for the German nation and for the German settlers in the colonies. In So sah ich unsere Südsee she writes that Chinese communists would want "the chaos on Earth and the absolute submission of humanity".

Her work after the fall of the Nazi regime consists of novels set on the farm in Dinglreit in Fürstenzell that she grew up on, describing the lives of three generations living on the farm in the novels Brunnöd I und Brunnöd II sowie Da Burgamoasta. The novels document the dialect that was spoken in Fürstenzell at the time.

== Selected works ==
- Deutsches Mädel auf Fahrt um die Welt, Leipzig 1932.
- Wann kommen die Deutschen endlich wieder? Eine Reise durch unsere Kolonien in Afrika, Leipzig 1935.
- Ein Mädel reist durch Afrika: Selbsterlebtes im schwarzen Erdteil. 1935.
- So sah ich unsere Südsee. 1939.
- Deutsche Frau in Afrika, Berlin 1940.
- Im Lande der Pharaonen, Berlin 1941.
- Junge Generation, Berlin 1941
- Ich besah mir die Welt, Biberach a.d. Riss 1954.
- Waldzirkus Kastorelli, Augsburg 1956.
- Da Burgamoasta, Passau 1957.
- Brunnöd 1, Passau 1957.
- Brunnöd 2, Passau 1957.
- Petzi der Bär, Berlin 1962.
