= Franz Xaver Feuchtmayer the Younger =

German sculptor (1735–1803)

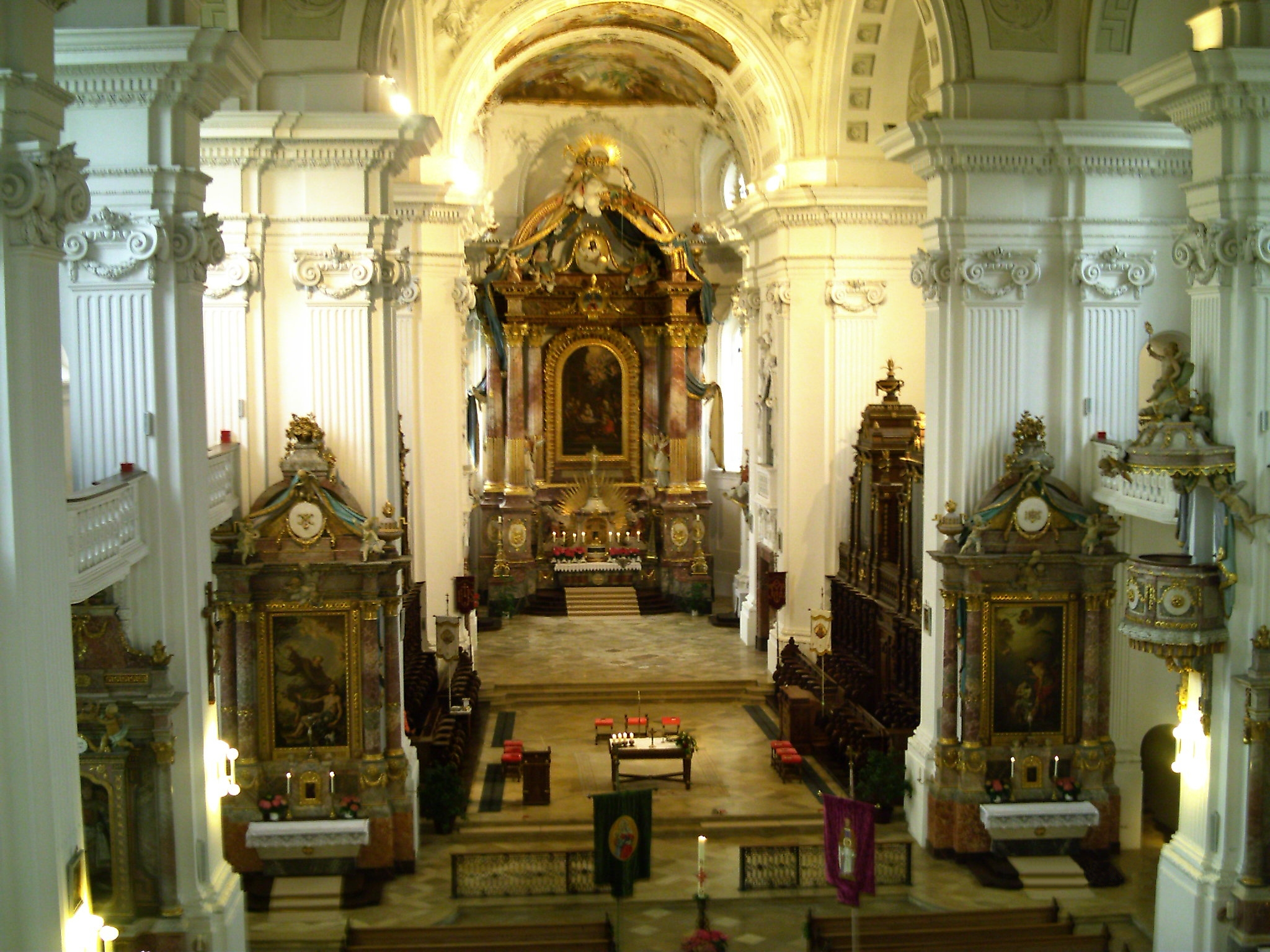
High altar and side altars in the Premonstratensian Monastery Church of St. Maria and St. Verena in Rot an der Rot

Franz Xaver Feuchtmayer (the Younger) (17 October 1735 – 6 January 1803) was a member of the German Feuchtmayer family of Baroque artists associated with the Wessobrunner School.

He was the son of Franz Xaver Feuchtmayer (the Elder) (1705–1764); the grandson of Michael Feuchtmayer (b. 1667); the great-nephew of Johann Michael Feuchtmayer (the Elder) (1666–1713) and Franz Joseph Feuchtmayer (1660–1718); and the first cousin once removed of Joseph Anton Feuchtmayer (1696–1770).

His most famous works are the baldacchino over the high altar and some of the side altars of the Premonstratensian Monastery Church of St. Maria and St. Verena in Rot an der Rot, constructed in 1777.
