= Johann Michael Feuchtmayer =

German sculptor (1709–1772)

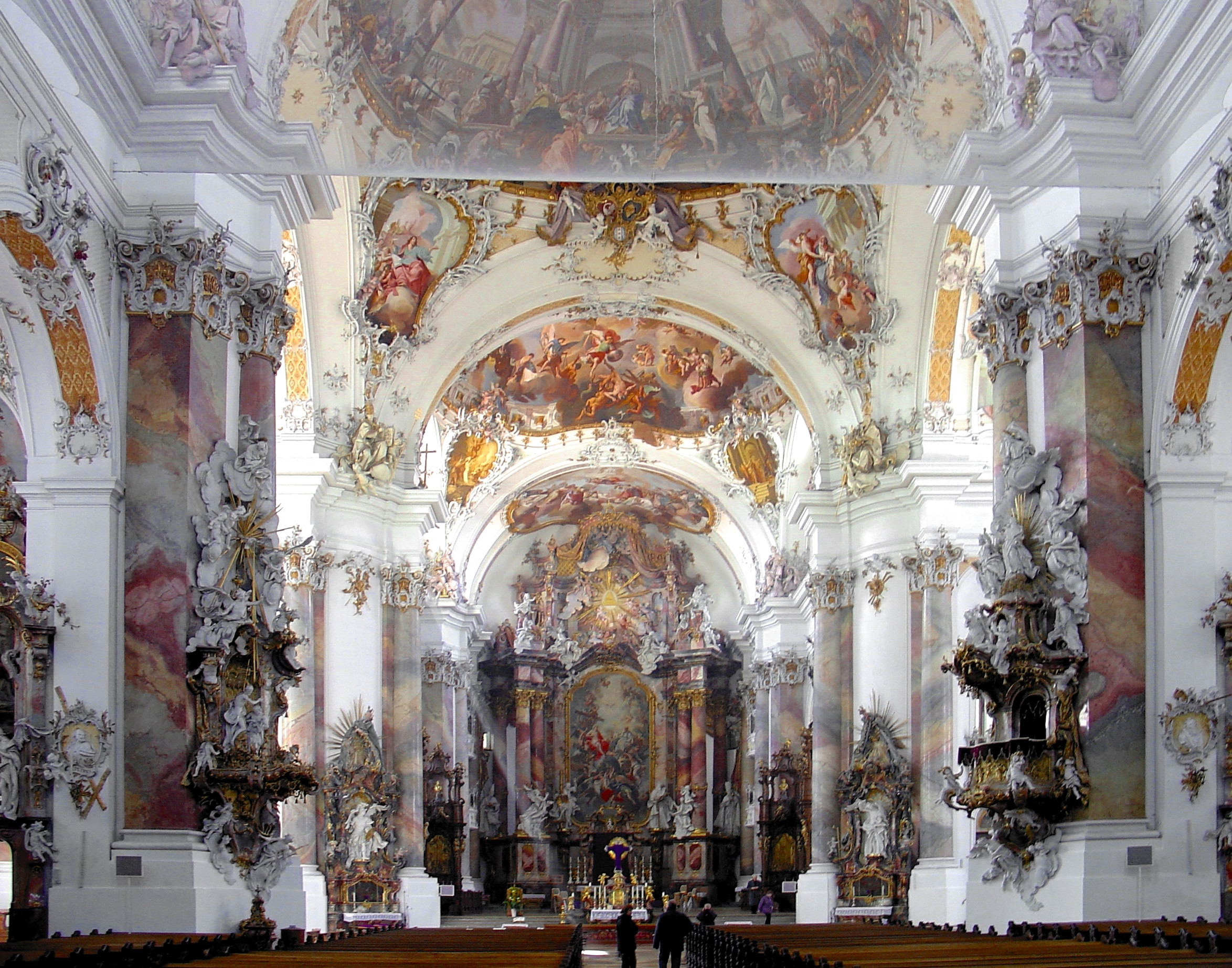
Interior of Ottobeuren Abbey, showing the stucco design of J. M. Feuchtmayer

Johann Michael Feuchtmayer (the Younger) (sometimes spelled Johann Michael Feuchtmayr or Feichtmayr) (1709 – June 4, 1772) was a German stuccoworker and sculptor of the late Baroque period. He collaborated with the architects Johann Michael Fischer, Johann Joseph Christian, and Franz Joseph Spiegler on numerous ecclesiastical buildings in Upper Swabia. His stucco decoration in the Benedictine abbey church (designed by Fischer) of Ottobeuren is considered his crowning achievement.

Feuchtmayer was born into a family of artists in Wessobrunn, Bavaria. He and his uncle, the stuccoworker Franz Joseph Feuchtmayer (1660–1718); his uncle, the painter Johann Michael Feuchtmayer the Elder (1666–1713); his brother Franz Xaver Feuchtmayer the Elder (1705–1764); his cousin, the painter and sculptor Joseph Anton Feuchtmayer (1696–1770); and his nephew, Franz Xaver Feuchtmayer the Younger (b. 1735), comprise the Wessobrunner School.

== Major works ==
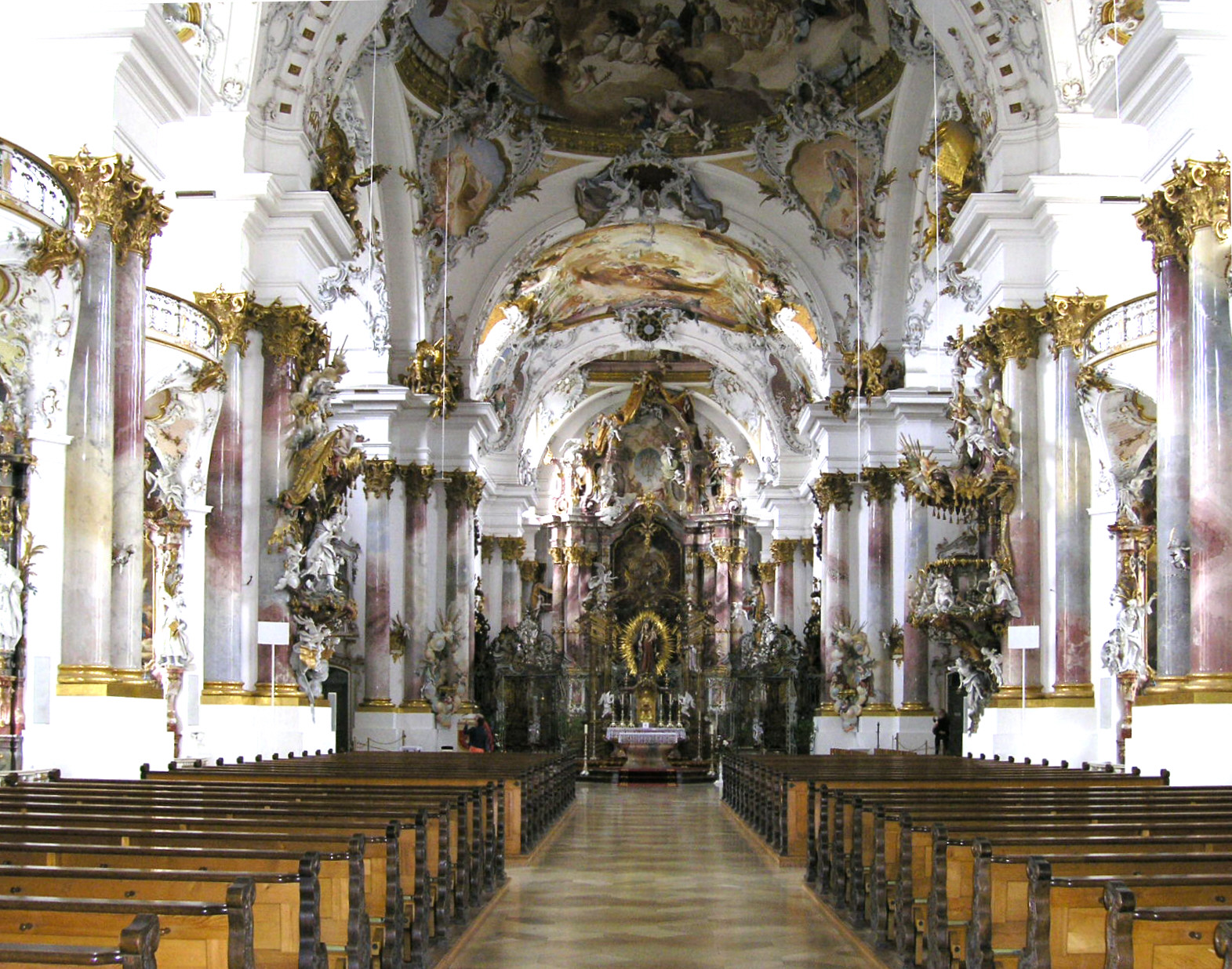
Zwiefalten Abbey stucco design by J. M. Feuchtmayer

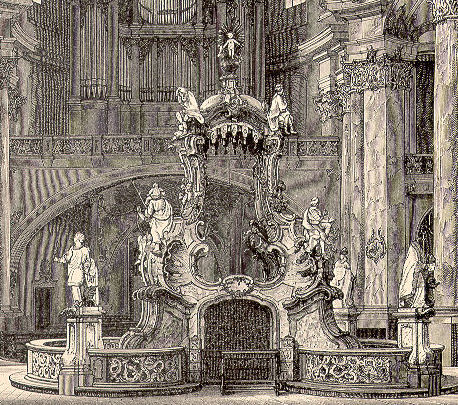
1891 drawing showing the stucco on the Gnadenaltar of the Pilgrimage Church of Vierzehnheiligen in Bad Staffelstein

=== Austria ===
- Wilhering—Stiftskirche Mariä Himmelfahrt (stucco in transepts and choir)

=== Baden-Württemberg ===
- Bad Säckingen—Convent Church of St. Fridolin (1751) (stucco)
- Haigerloch—Pilgrimage Church of St. Anne (1753–1755) (stucco work and side altar design)
- Kisslegg—Neues Schloss (New Castle) (1721–1727) (stucco figures of the Sibyls on the staircase)
- Seeon im Chiemgau—Chapel of St. Nicholas at the Benedictine Monastery of St. Lambert (stucco)
- Sigmaringen—Catholic Parish Church of St. John the Evangelist (altars)
- Zwiefalten—Zwiefalten Abbey (1741–1747) (stucco)

=== Bavaria ===
- Amorbach—Benedictine Abbey Church of St. Maria (high altar and other altars)
- Augsburg—Dominican Church of St. Magdalena (1716) (stucco)
- Dießen am Ammersee—Church of St. Maria (completed 1739) (stucco)
- Ottobeuren—Benedictine Monastery Church of the Holy Trinity (1737–1766) (stucco)
- Staffelstein—Pilgrimage Church of Vierzehnheiligen (stucco on the Gnadenaltar)
- Würzburg—Wallfahrtskirche Mariä Heimsuchung (1747–1750) (stucco)
