= Fürstenzell =

- Municipality
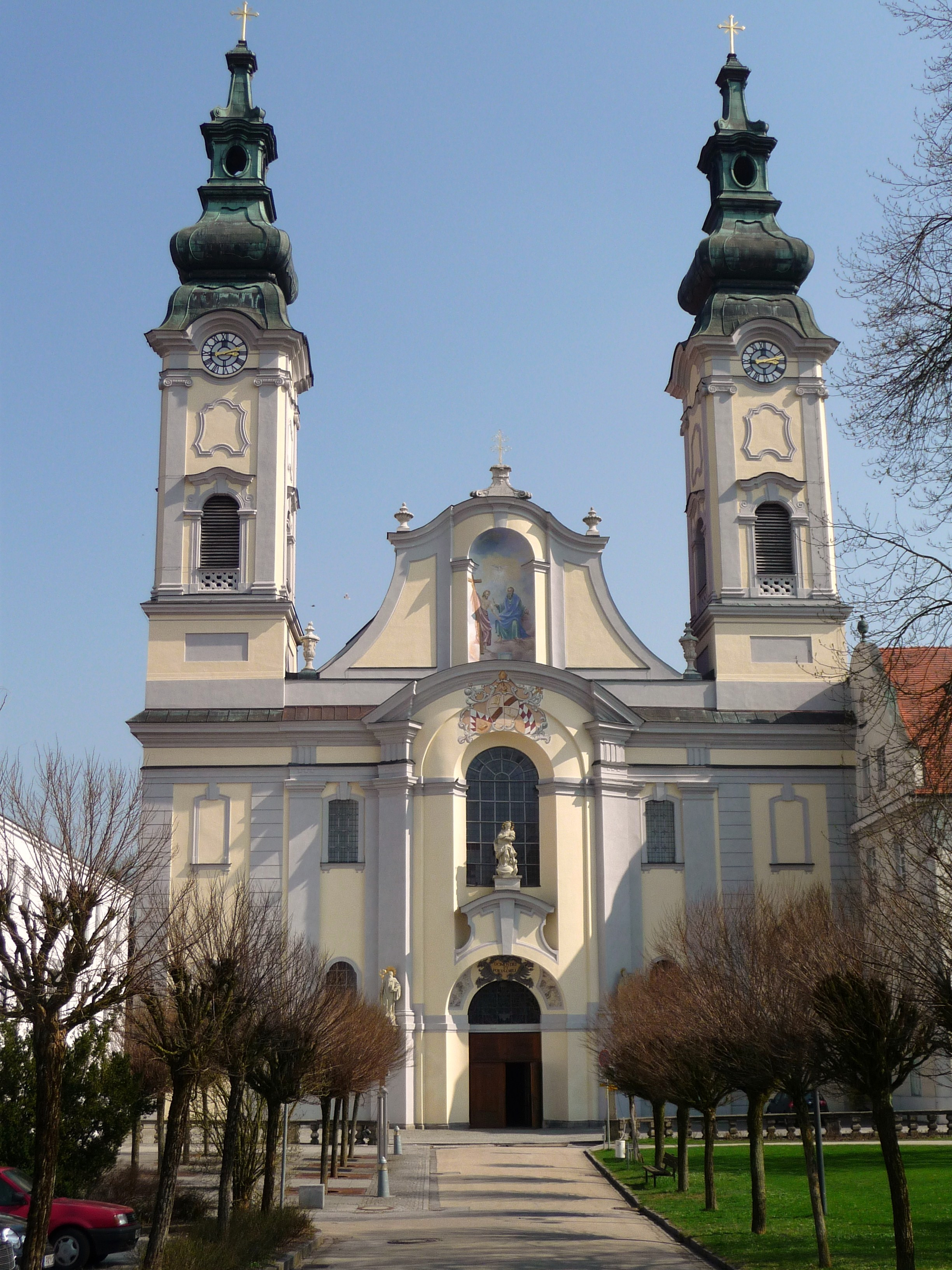
- Fürstenzell Abbey Church

- Coat of arms

- Location of Fürstenzell within Passau district
- Interactive map of Fürstenzell
- Location within Germany Location within Bavaria
- Coordinates: 48°32′N 13°19′E
- Country: Germany
- State: Bavaria
- Admin. region: Niederbayern
- District: Passau

Government
  - Mayor (2020–26): Manfred Hammer (SPD)

Area
  - Total: 79.36 km^{2} (30.64 sq mi)
- Elevation: 320–497 m (1,050–1,631 ft)

Population (2025-12-31)
  - Total: 8,442
  - Density: 106.4/km^{2} (275.5/sq mi)
- Time zone: UTC+01:00 (CET)
  - Summer (DST): UTC+02:00 (CEST)
- Postal codes: 94081
- Dialling codes: 08502
- Vehicle registration: PA
- Website: www.fuerstenzell.de

Fürstenzell (German pronunciation: [ˈfʏʁstn̩tsɛl]; Central Bavarian: Fiaschtnzei) is a municipality in the district of Passau in Bavaria in Germany.

== Climate ==
Climate data for Fürstenzell (1991–2020 normals)
| Month | Jan | Feb | Mar | Apr | May | Jun | Jul | Aug | Sep | Oct | Nov | Dec | Year |
|---|---|---|---|---|---|---|---|---|---|---|---|---|---|
| Mean daily maximum °C (°F) | 1.3 (34.3) | 3.8 (38.8) | 8.8 (47.8) | 14.7 (58.5) | 18.9 (66.0) | 22.5 (72.5) | 24.0 (75.2) | 23.8 (74.8) | 18.8 (65.8) | 13.0 (55.4) | 6.4 (43.5) | 2.3 (36.1) | 13.2 (55.8) |
| Daily mean °C (°F) | −1.2 (29.8) | 0.5 (32.9) | 4.5 (40.1) | 9.5 (49.1) | 13.8 (56.8) | 17.3 (63.1) | 18.6 (65.5) | 18.5 (65.3) | 13.9 (57.0) | 9.0 (48.2) | 3.6 (38.5) | 0.0 (32.0) | 9.0 (48.2) |
| Mean daily minimum °C (°F) | −3.7 (25.3) | −2.6 (27.3) | 0.6 (33.1) | 4.5 (40.1) | 8.8 (47.8) | 12.3 (54.1) | 13.6 (56.5) | 13.5 (56.3) | 9.6 (49.3) | 5.5 (41.9) | 1.1 (34.0) | −2.3 (27.9) | 5.1 (41.2) |
| Average precipitation mm (inches) | 66.5 (2.62) | 57.2 (2.25) | 69.5 (2.74) | 46.4 (1.83) | 93.6 (3.69) | 86.0 (3.39) | 111.0 (4.37) | 92.5 (3.64) | 71.8 (2.83) | 64.0 (2.52) | 56.4 (2.22) | 61.4 (2.42) | 872.4 (34.35) |
| Average precipitation days (≥ 1.0 mm) | 17.4 | 14.6 | 15.2 | 11.8 | 15.6 | 15.5 | 16.5 | 13.8 | 12.9 | 14.8 | 14.2 | 17.5 | 180.2 |
| Average snowy days (≥ 1.0 cm) | 18.2 | 14.7 | 6.8 | 0.2 | 0 | 0 | 0 | 0 | 0 | 0.1 | 3.9 | 11.4 | 55.3 |
| Average relative humidity (%) | 90.2 | 84.1 | 76.5 | 69.1 | 72.1 | 82.5 | 73.8 | 74.6 | 81.3 | 87.2 | 92.2 | 91.9 | 81.3 |
| Mean monthly sunshine hours | 57.0 | 92.9 | 148.4 | 205.5 | 223.8 | 242.8 | 241.6 | 236.6 | 176.1 | 116.0 | 58.3 | 49.2 | 1,846.5 |
Source: World Meteorological Organization

== Notable people ==
- Senta Dinglreiter (1893–1969), writer, most known for her Nazi-era colonial literature and her post-war novels about farm life in Fürstenzell
