= Wessobrunner School =

Group of Baroque stucco-workers from the Benedictine Wessobrunn Abbey in Bavaria, Germany

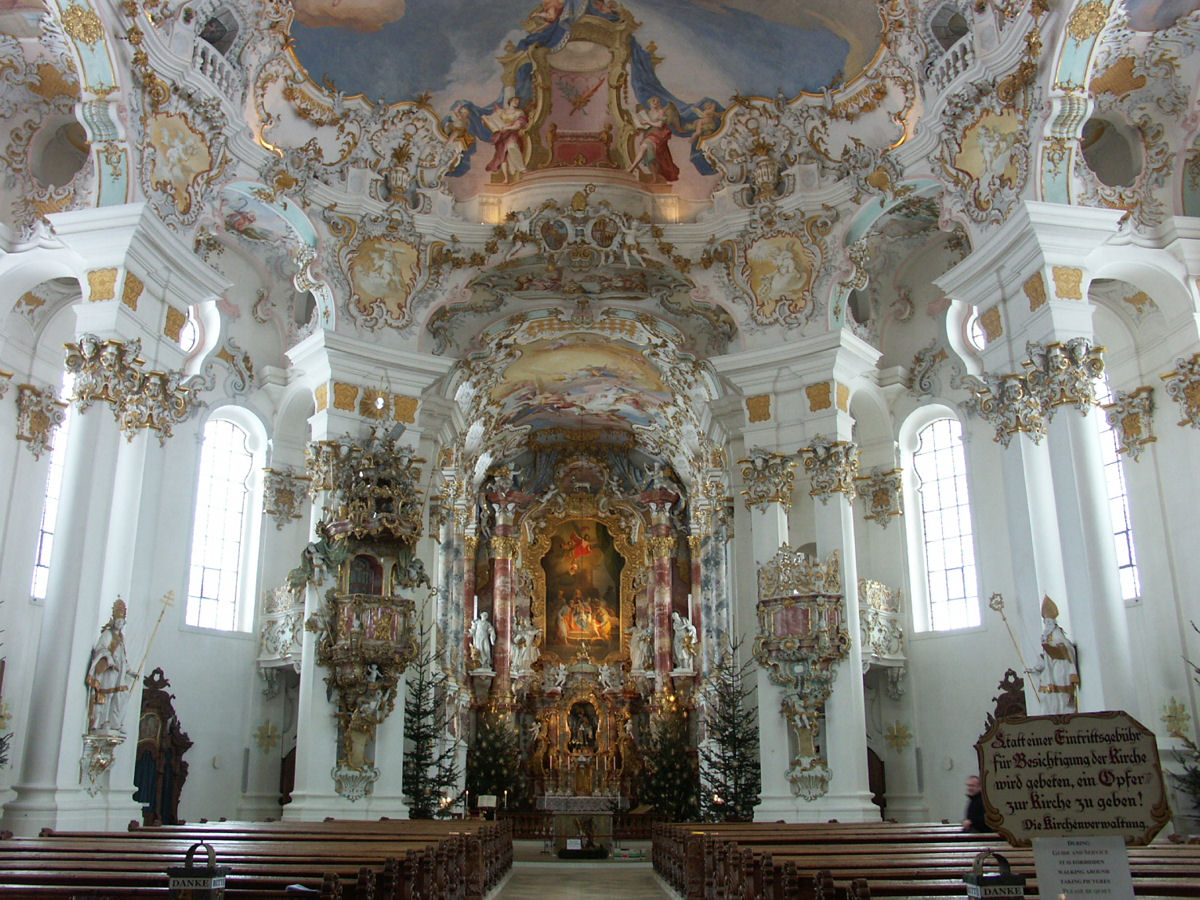
Dominikus Zimmermann's work at Wies Church, Steingaden, Germany

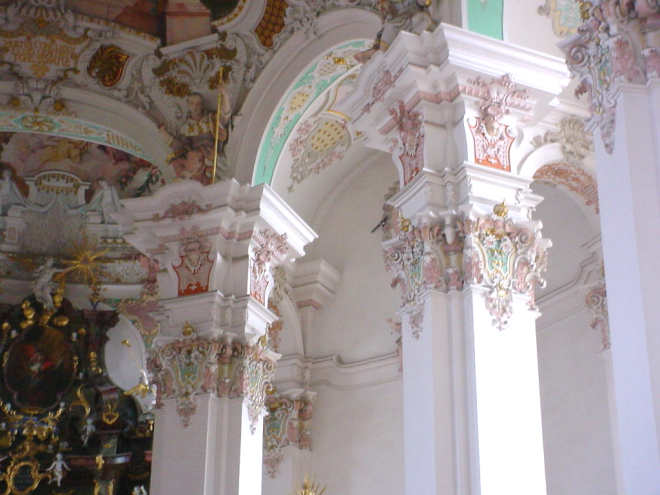
Wessobrunner stucco at Schussenried Abbey

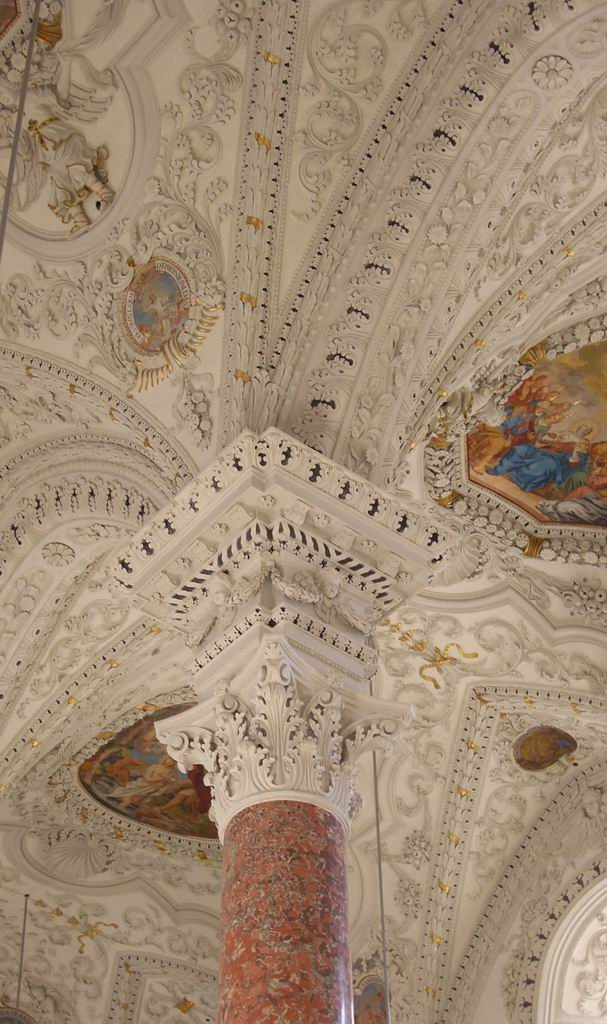
Late Baroque stucco with some Rococo elements in the Kreuzherrnkirche in Memmingen

The Wessobrunner School is the name for a group of Baroque stucco-workers that, beginning at the end of the 17th century, developed in the Benedictine Wessobrunn Abbey in Bavaria, Germany.

The names of more than 600 stucco-workers who emerged from this school are known. The Wessobrunner stucco-workers exerted a decisive influence on, and at times even dominated, the art of stucco in south Germany in the 18th century.

The concept of the Wessobrunner School goes back to the art historians Gustav von Bezold and Georg Hacker, who in 1888 first used the name to designate this group of artists and craftsmen.

== Members ==
The most important members were the brothers Johann Baptist Zimmermann and Dominikus Zimmermann, and the Schmuzer and Feichtmayer/Feuchtmayer families, both of whom were active over multiple generations. Certain members also worked as architects, including Johann and Joseph Schmuzer and Dominikus Zimmermann. Other important family names include Finsterwalder, Gigl, Merck, Rauch, Schaidauf, Übelher, and Zöpf.

== Development of stucco-work ==
The technique of stucco-work was already in use around 7,000 BCE, and flourished during the Italian Renaissance. In Germany it appeared for the first time around 1545 CE in the Landshut Residence. A passage in the Historico-Topographica Descriptio of Michael Wenig (1701) suggests that the residents of the villages Gaispoint and Haid, which belonged to Wessobrunn Abbey, worked predominantly as stucco-workers and bricklayers, which would imply a tradition of long standing.

In Bavaria, an alliance between native bricklayers and stonemasons and Italian stucco-workers developed at the end of the 16th century. In the 17th century Wessobrunn developed into the most important center for stucco-work in Europe, and its craftsmen received commissions, not only in south Germany, but also in France, Poland, Hungary, and Russia. Their Italian competitors were unable to keep up.

Around 1750, a general decrease in building activity set in, as most of the great Rococo and pilgrimage churches had been completed. In addition, a new wave of neo-classical architecture between 1775 and 1790 lessened the prestige of the stucco-artist. The "Society of Stucco-workers", founded in 1783, still had 68 members; in 1798 there were 27, and by 1864 only 9.

The masterpiece of the Wessobrunner School is the Wies Church (from 1744), built and stuccoed by Dominikus Zimmermann and frescoed by his brother, Johann Baptist. In this building, even architectural elements become, as it were, ornament. The arches of the choir arcade are in fact monumental bisected rocaille-cartouches. To be sure, only Dominikus Zimmermann made the leap to this uncompromising architectural application of the rocaille.

As Bavarian artists began to stray from sculptural stucco and the taste of the time demanded more sobriety and functionality, the Wessobrunner School gradually lost its reason for being.

The reach of the Wessobrunner stucco-workers may today be observed in numerous European countries, and above all in western Austria.

== Extern links ==
Media related to Wessobrunner Schule at Wikimedia Commons
