= Fürstenzell Abbey =

Cistercian Abbey in Fürstenzell

- Kloster Fürstenzell
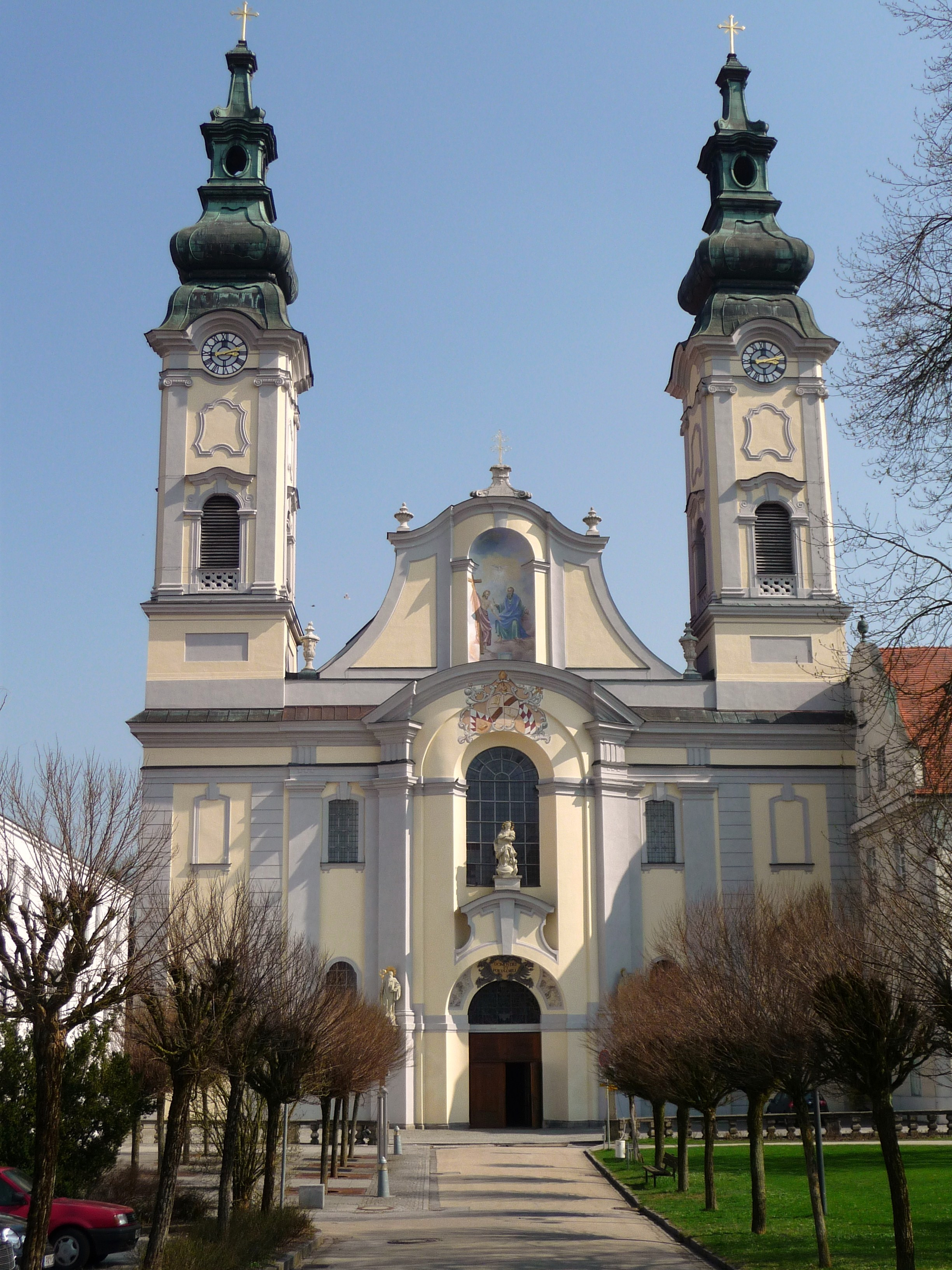
- Façade of the abbey church

- Location within Bavaria Location within Germany
- Interactive map of Fürstenzell Abbey

Monastery information
- Other name: Abbatia Cella Principis
- Order: Cisterians
- Denomination: Roman Catholic
- Established: 1274
- Disestablished: 1803
- Mother house: Aldersbach Abbey
- Dedication: St. Laurentius and later to St. Mary
- Consecrated: 1334
- Diocese: diocese of Passau

Site
- Location: Fürstenzell, Bavaria
- Country: Germany
- Coordinates: 48°31′16″N 13°19′0″E
- Website: https://www.klosterpark.eu/

Fürstenzell Abbey (German: Kloster Fürstenzell, Latin: Abbatia Cella Principis) is a former Cistercian abbey in Fürstenzell, in Bavaria, in the diocese of Passau. It was a daughter monastery of the Aldersbach monastery from the filiation of the Morimond primary abbey - Ebrach monastery.

== History ==
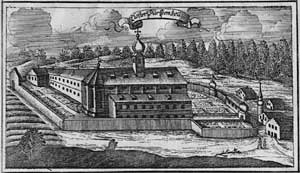
Anton Wilhelm Ertl: Fürstenzell Monastery, from the "Churbaierische Atlas" of 1687

The monastery, first dedicated to St. Laurentius and later to St. Mary, was founded in 1274 by Magister Hartwig, canon of Passau and court chaplain to Duke Henry XIII of Lower Bavaria, with his help. The name "Fürstenzell" (Cella principis) also refers to Henry XIII. The first Cistercians arrived here from Aldersbach Abbey in Advent 1274. In May 1275, the monk Walter was elected the first abbot.

The abbot from 1566 was Sebastian Peer, from Frontenhausen. He initially became administrator in 1562, after having been a monk in Gotteszell, and eventually died between December 16 and 26, 1570.

In addition to the main abbey church, the monastery also had its own, separate church. Under the abbots Abundus II (1707–1727), Stephan III (1727–1761) and Otto II (1761–1792), the monastery was at its height with the construction of the current church. It was dissolved in 1803 in the course of secularization. The abbey church became the parish church in 1807 in place of the church in Unterirsham, which was then demolished. The monastery buildings were acquired by the Wieniger brewery, which later sold them on to the Hacklberg episcopal brewery in 1928.

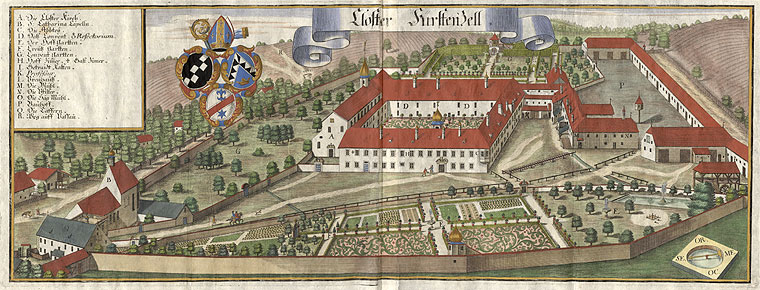
Michael Wening: Fürstenzell Monastery, from "Historico-topographica descriptio Bavariae" (1701–1728)

In 1930, Marists acquired the monastery and set up a missionary seminary here. During the Second World War, a military hospital was set up in the monastery. In 1948, the order founded the Marist grammar school in Fürstenzell, and the school's boarding school was located here from 1970 to 1990. Subsequently, part of the building served as a spiritual education center for the diocese of Passau until 2004. In 2007, the Marists sold the monastery to the company CNP International. Later, in 2023, the Fürstenzell government bought all of the land around the monastery, a total of 6,600 square metres (1.6 acres), from the Marists for the public.

== Church of the Ascension of the Blessed Virgin ==
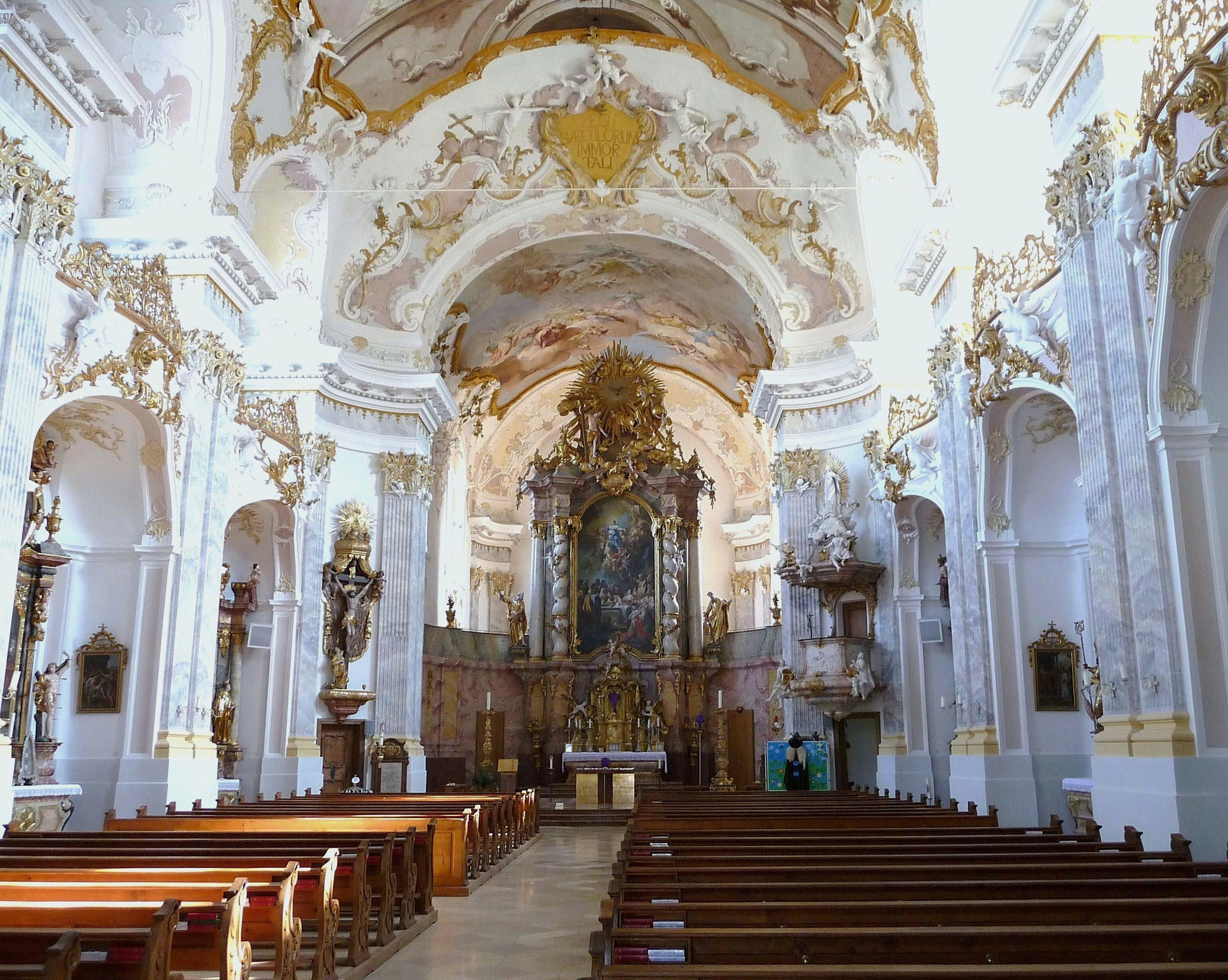
Interior view of the church

The first monastery church was consecrated in 1334 by Auxiliary Bishop Theoderich from Passau. It was baroqueized in the 18th century, when the monastery was in its heyday. The new building, begun in 1739 by Joseph Wolff and the Passau sculptor and architect Joseph Matthias Götz, was continued by Johann Michael Fischer. The roof was put on in 1740, the façade was created in 1744 and the building was completed in 1745, apart from the south tower, which was only erected in 1774. In 1748, the church was consecrated by the Prince-Bishop of Passau, Joseph Dominikus von Lamberg. An inscription on the organ loft with a chronogram commemorates this.

In terms of architectural styling, the façade has two towers, each with a clock on them. The nave is divided into four bays, and lacks a crossing, while the choir has two bays.

The church is also known as the "Cathedral of the Rottal" due to its size. The wide double-tower façade has a figure of the Immaculata above the portal, with St. Benedict and St. Bernard to the side. The entryway has the words Domus Dei et Porta Coeli (House of God and Gate of Heaven) written above.

The interior follows the pattern of a pilaster church. The high altar, completed in 1741, is by Johann Baptist Straub, the side altars from 1720 to 1730 by Joseph Matthias Götz. The stucco work was created by Johann Baptist Modler, the frescoes and the high altar painting of the Assumption of the Virgin Mary as well as other altarpieces by Johann Jakob Zeiller.

Above the choir, Zeiller painted the Adoration of the Lamb according to the Book of Revelation. The 30 meter long and 15 meter wide ceiling painting in the nave shows the Cistercians, led by allegorical figures of the vows and virtues, on the clouds in front of Mary and the Most Holy Trinity. The outcasts, on the other hand, are falling down.

== Monastery building ==
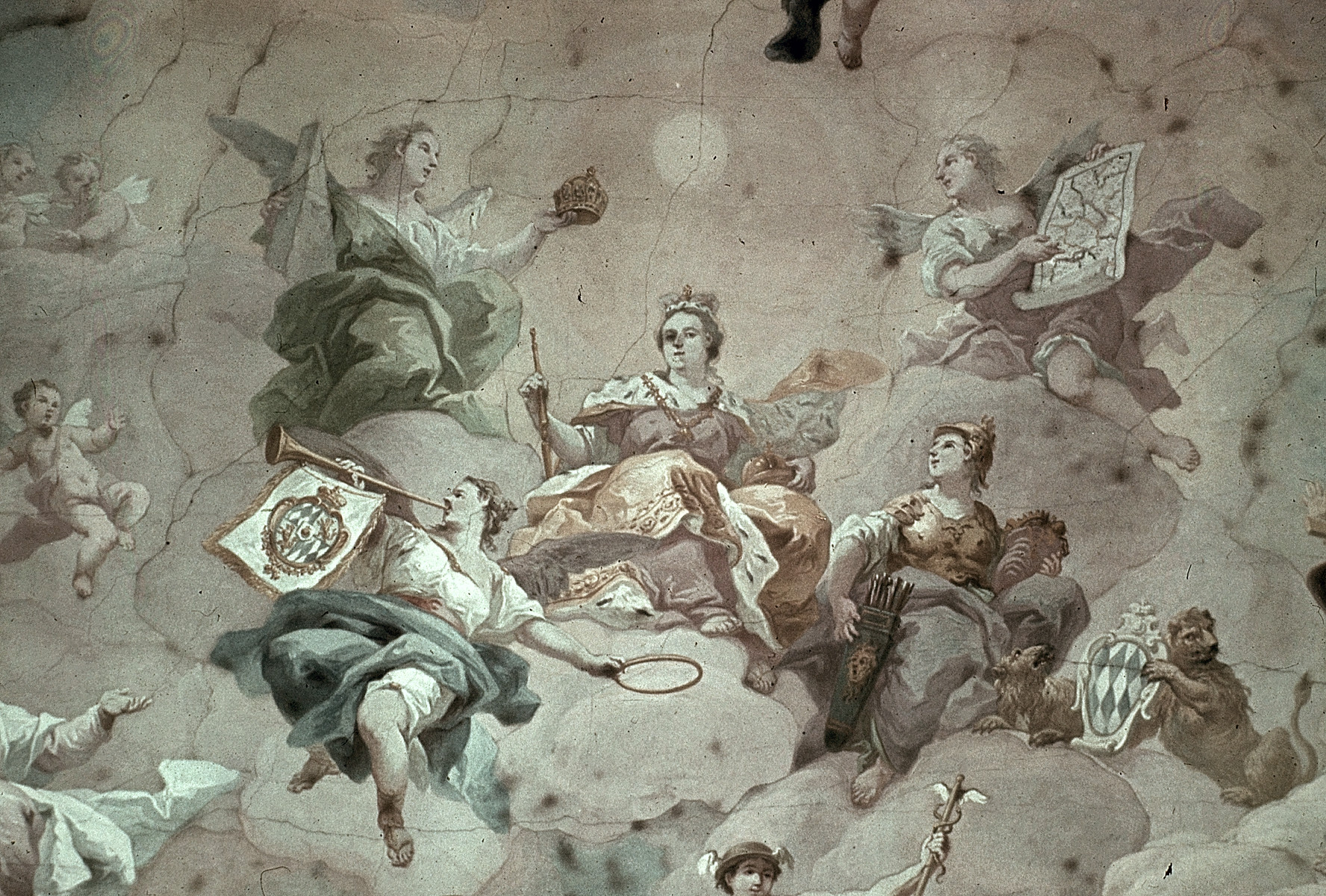
Ceiling painting by Bartolomeo Altomonte in the Fürstensaal depicting Bavaria as a queen being crowned by an angel

The monastery buildings are also significant. They were built around an inner courtyard in 1687 and the west and south wings were redesigned around 1770 under Abbot Otto Prasser. The banqueting hall or Fürstensaal (now the chapel) was decorated with ceiling paintings by Bartolomeo Altomonte in 1733, the former dining hall by Johann Gfall. The staircase is spanned by a painting by Zeiller created around 1765. The library room was created after 1770 by Joseph Deutschmann from Passau, who created the carvings, in particular the gallery balustrade resting on atlases with numerous putti and ornaments. Above the side staircases, putti fence with sausages instead of weapons in an allegorical allusion. The ceiling fresco by Zeiller and Matthäus Günther was removed in the 19th century.

== Gallery ==
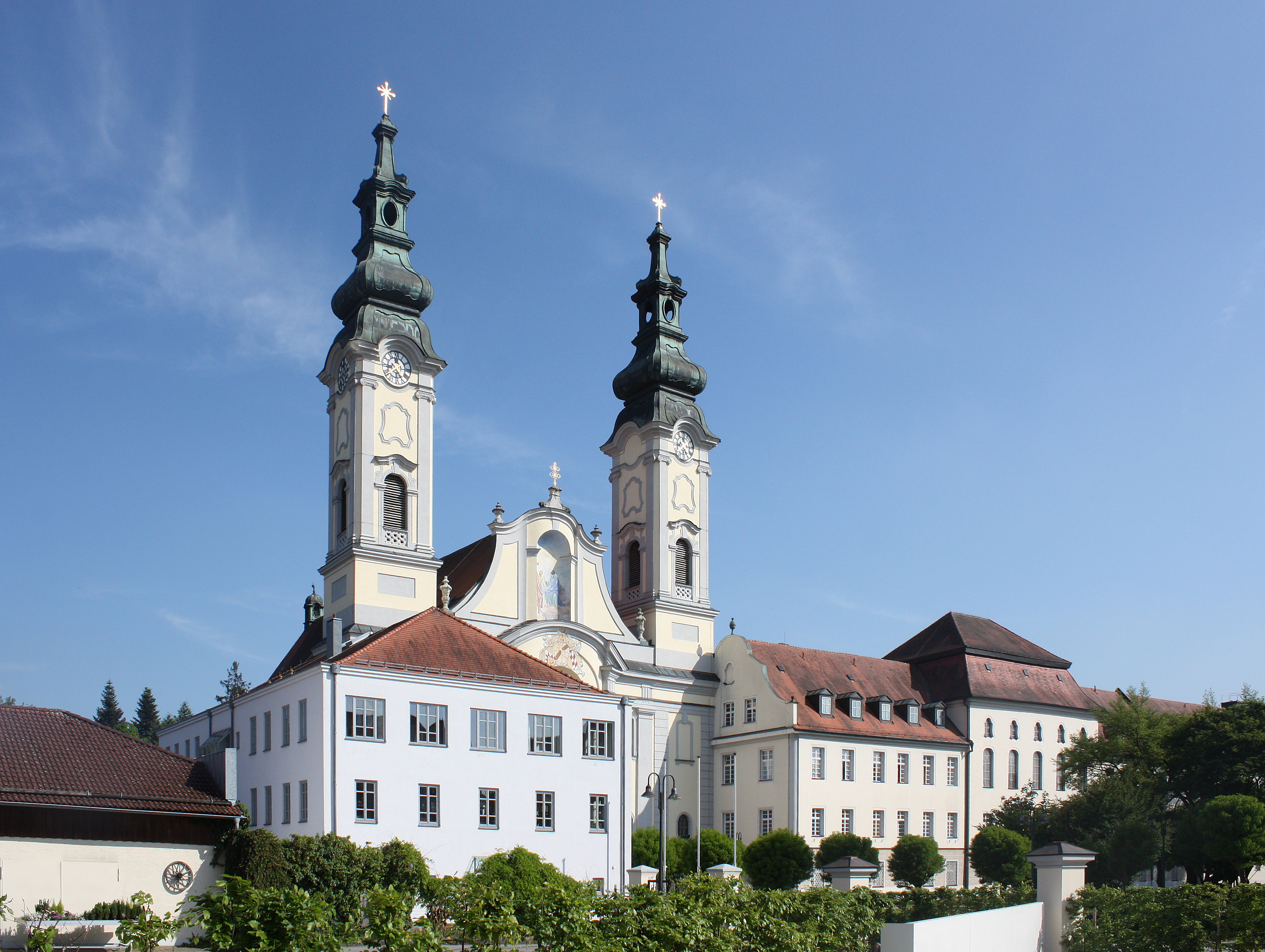
Church in context of monastery

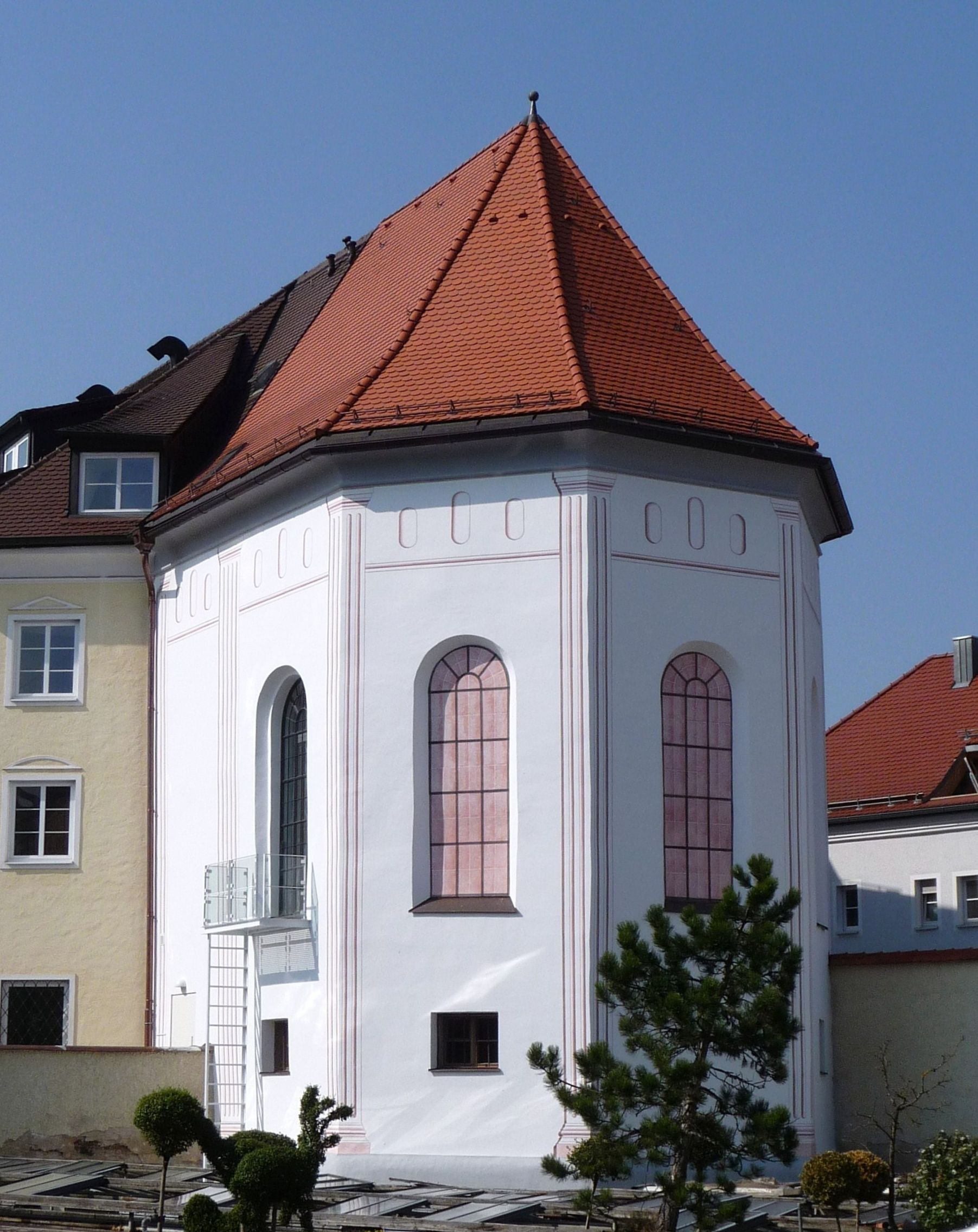
Rear of church

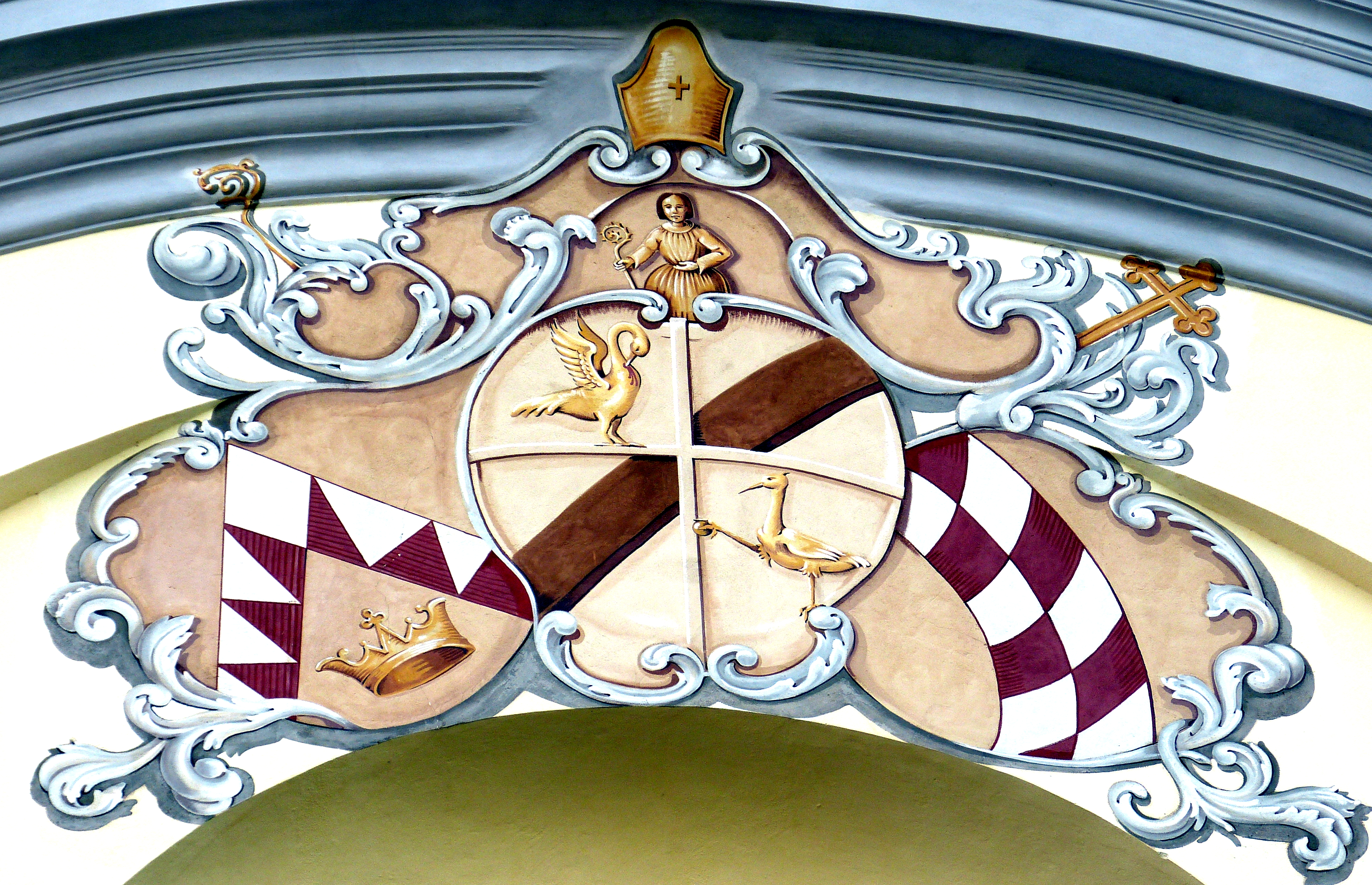
Flag on façade

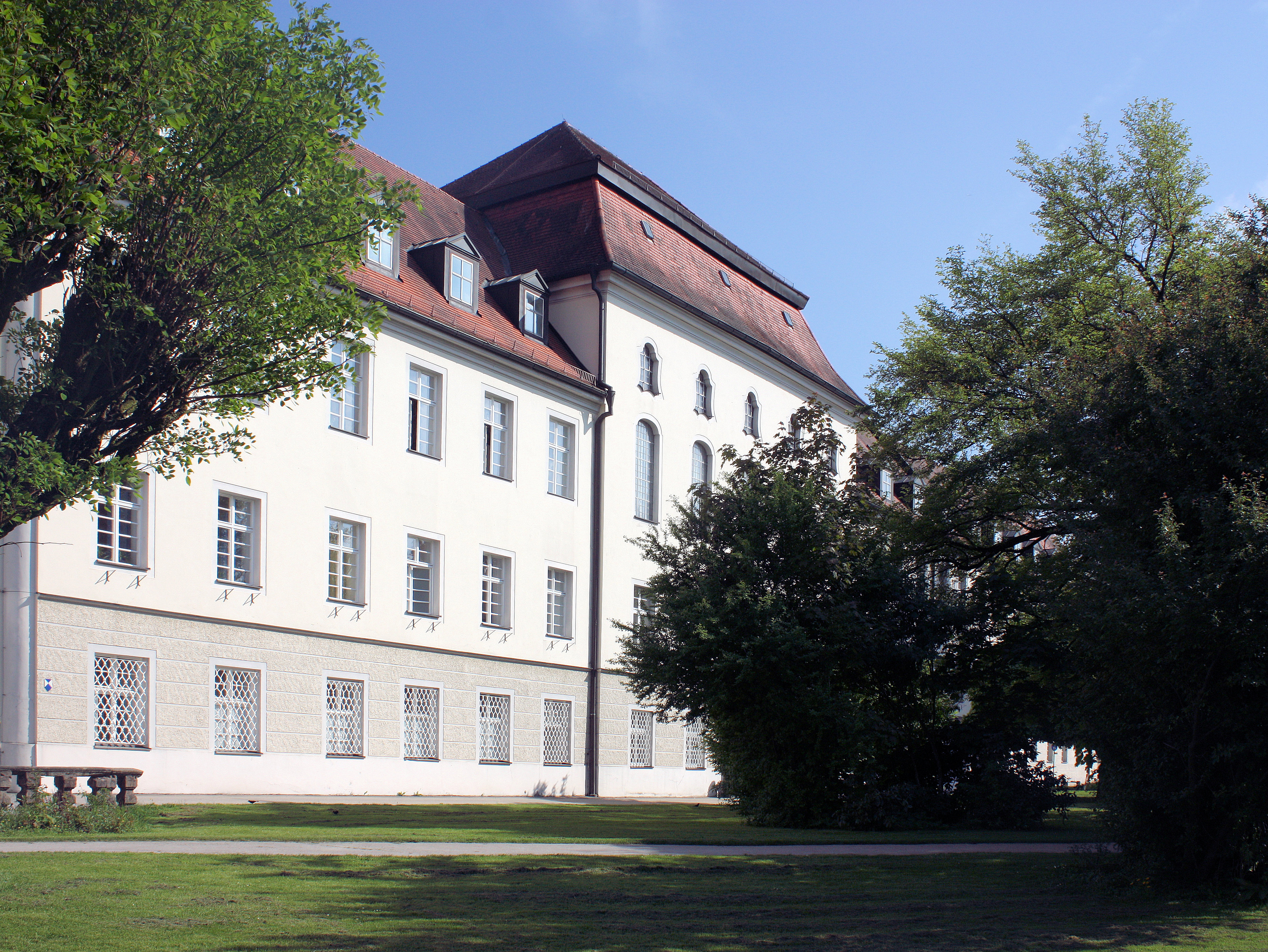
Monastery buildings

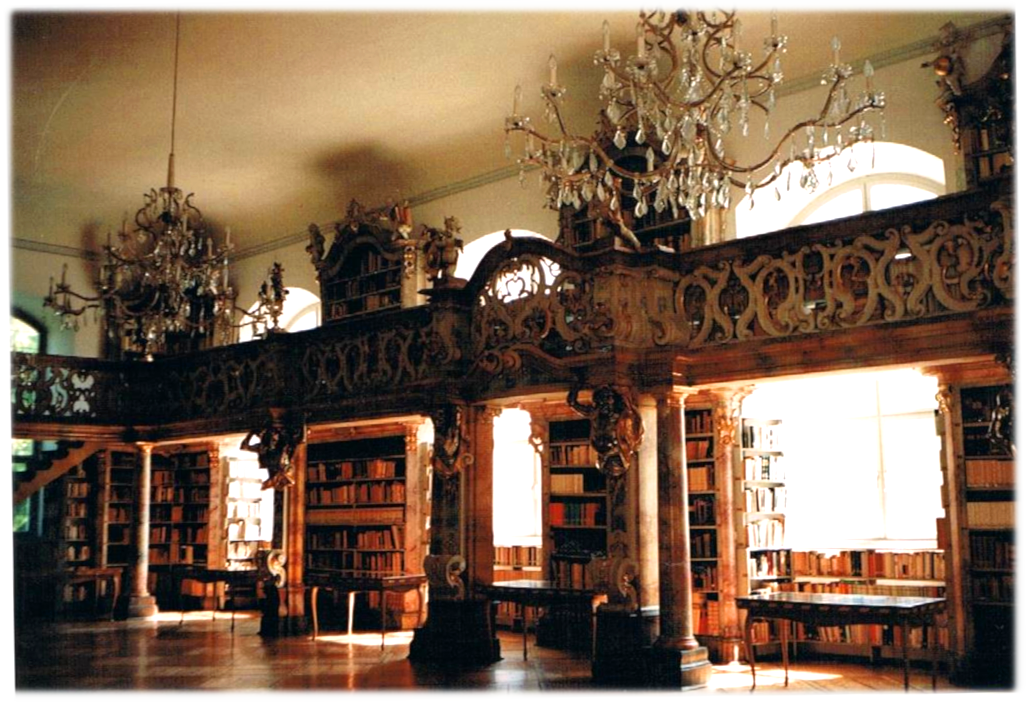
Library

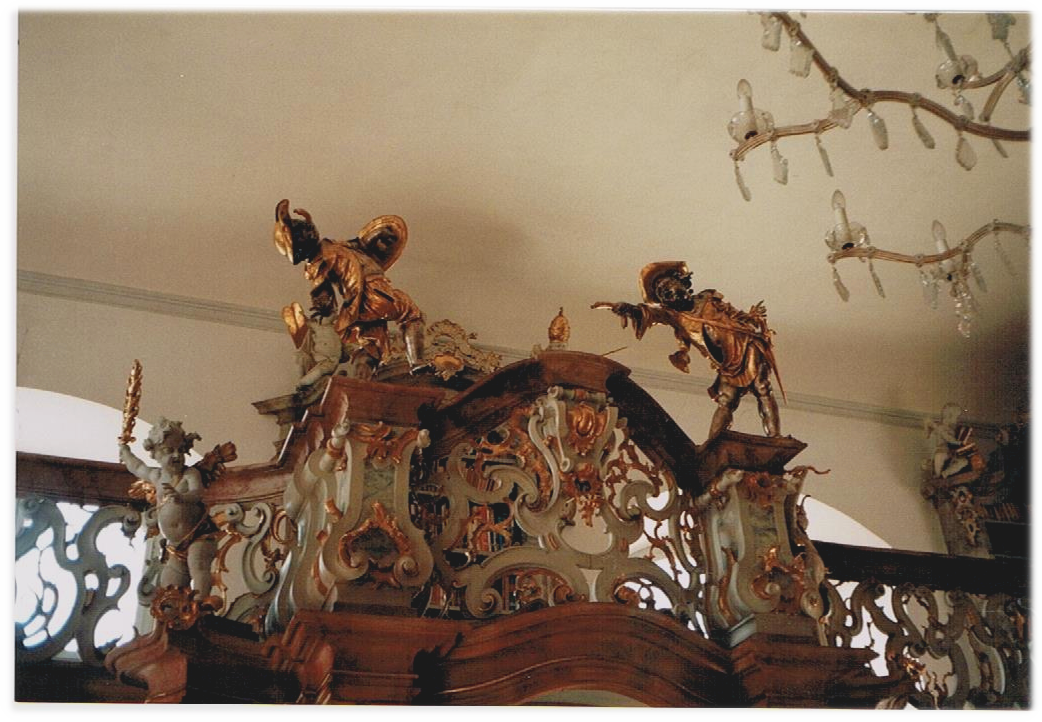
Close-up of library décor

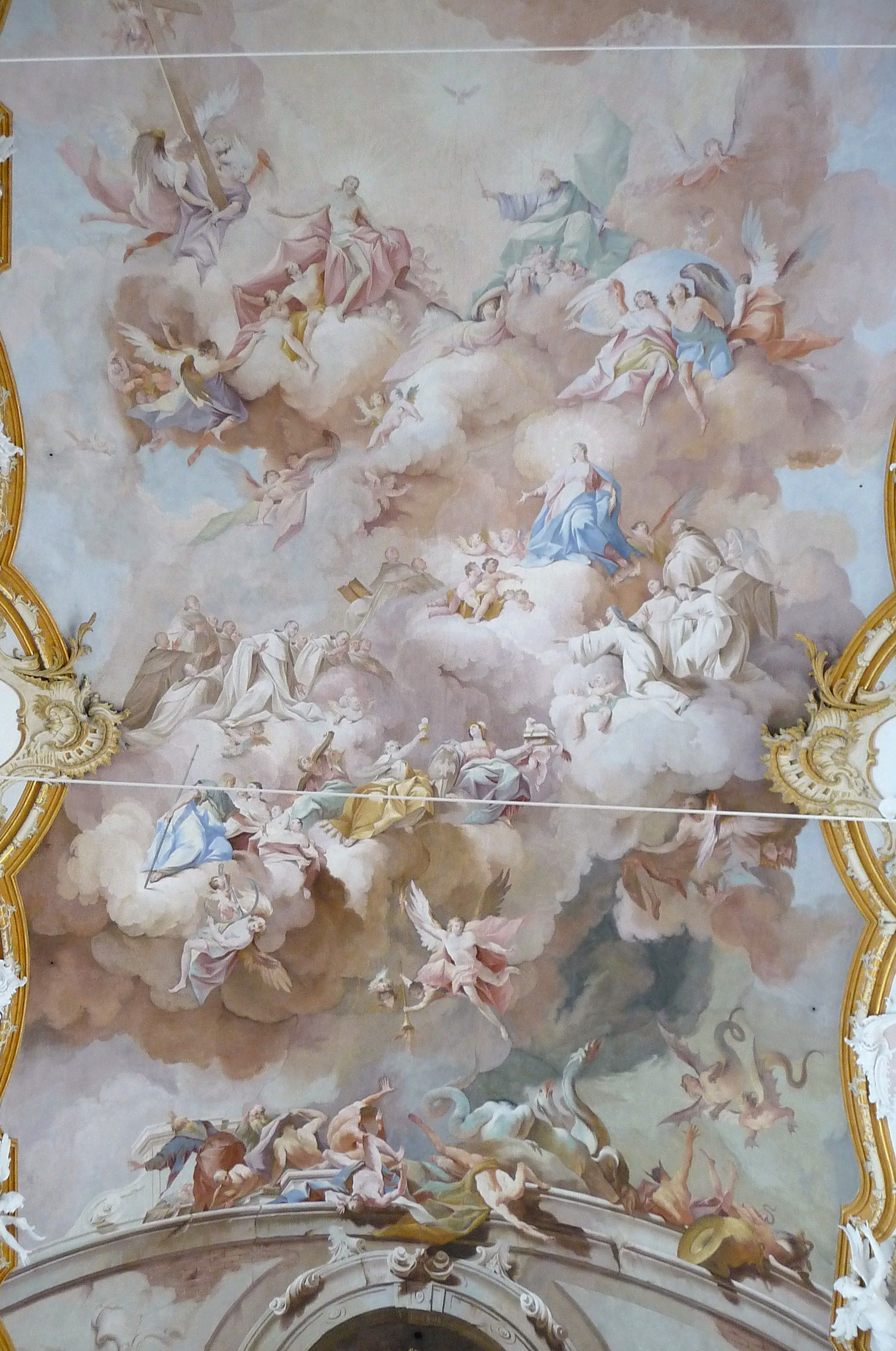
Fresco view

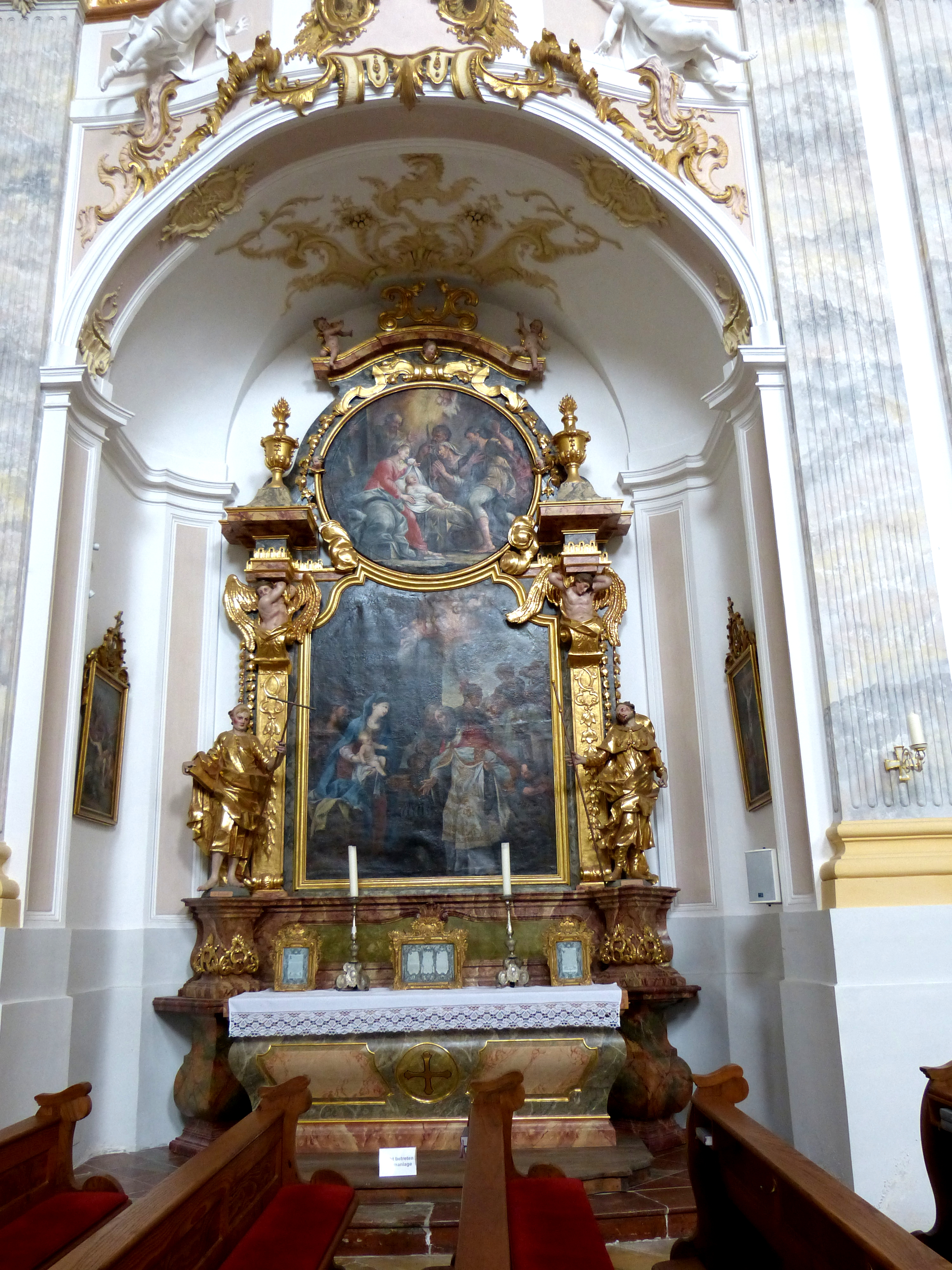
Side altar with three kings

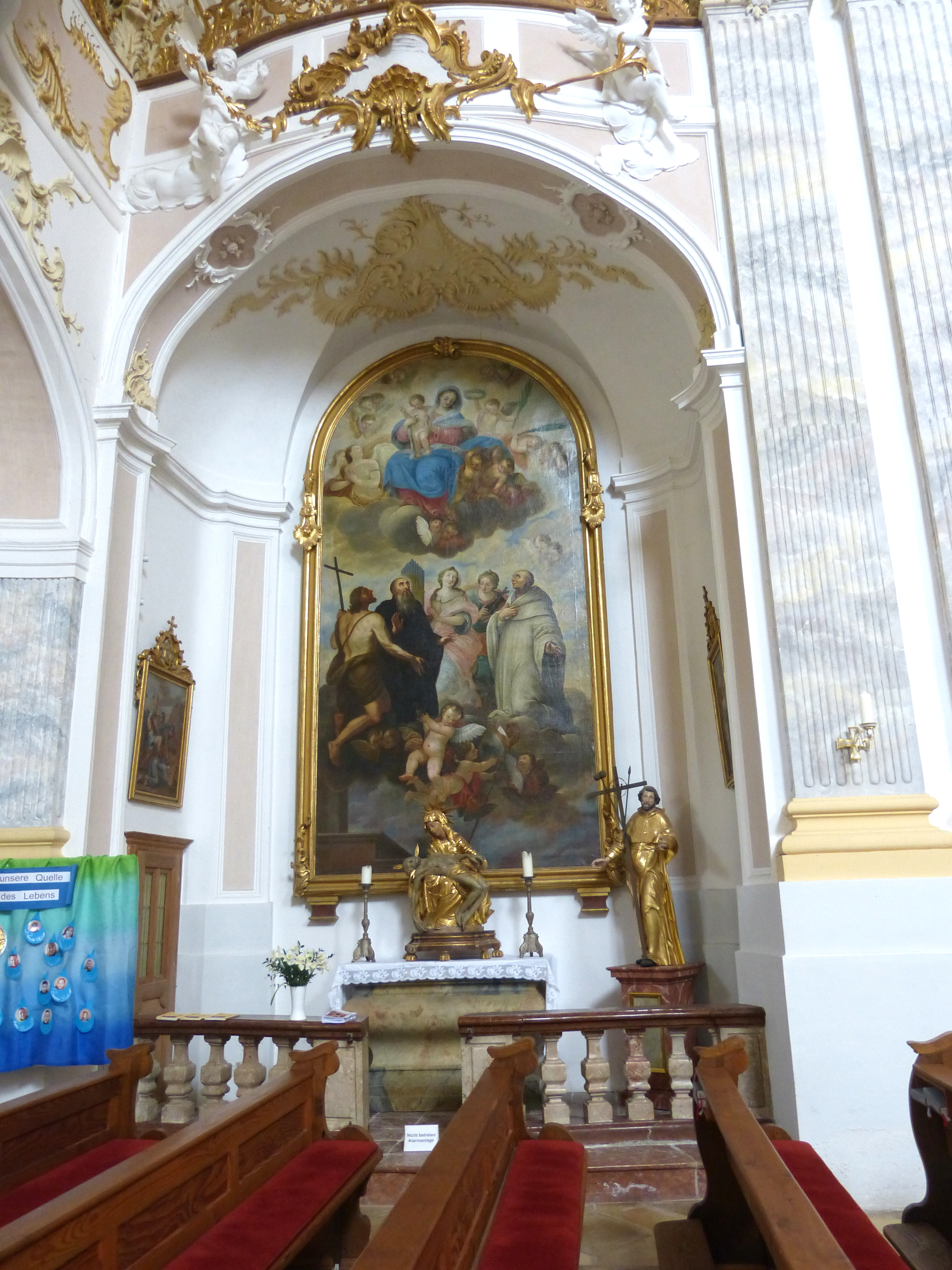
Altar with Mary

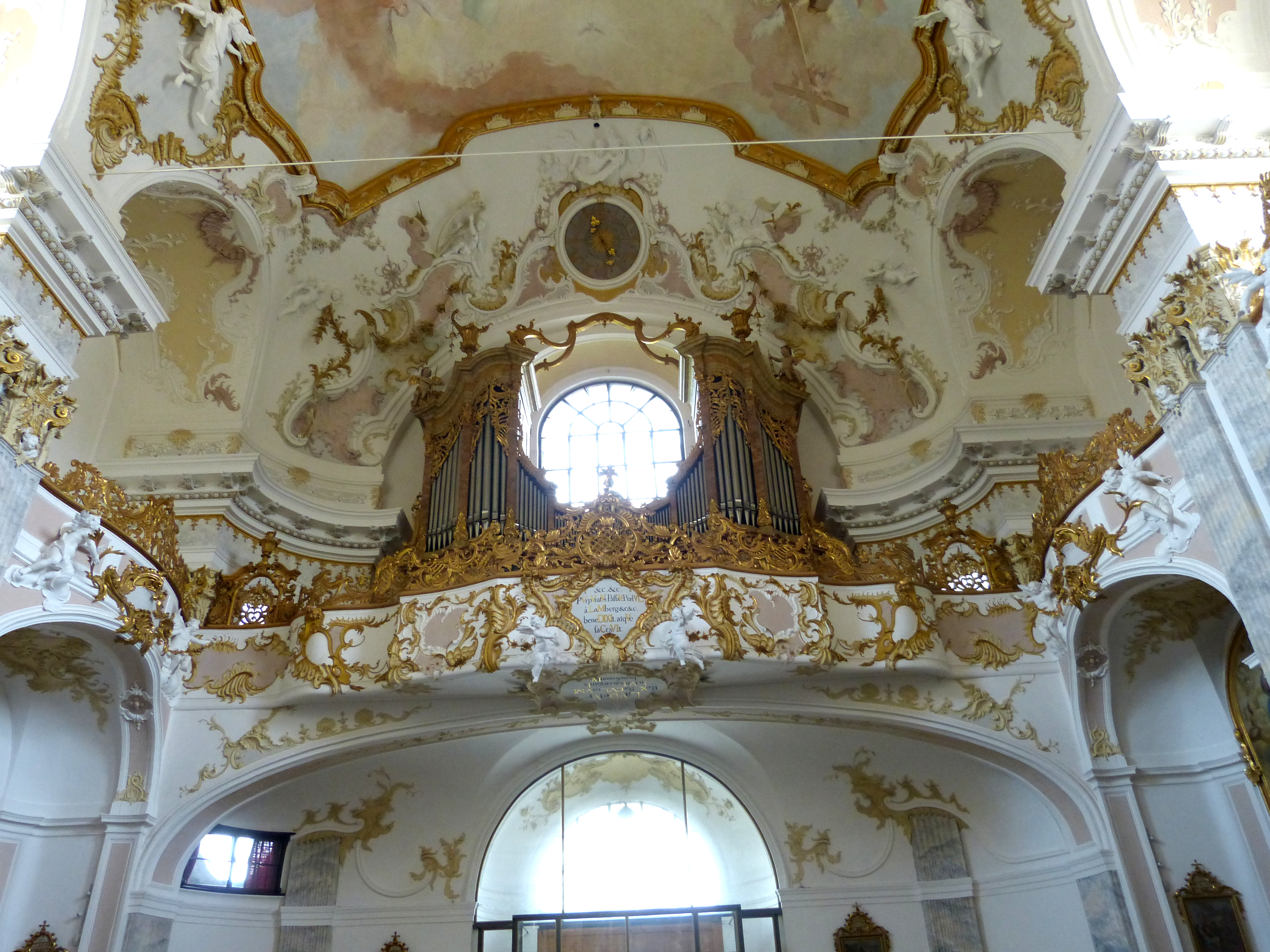
Organ in loft

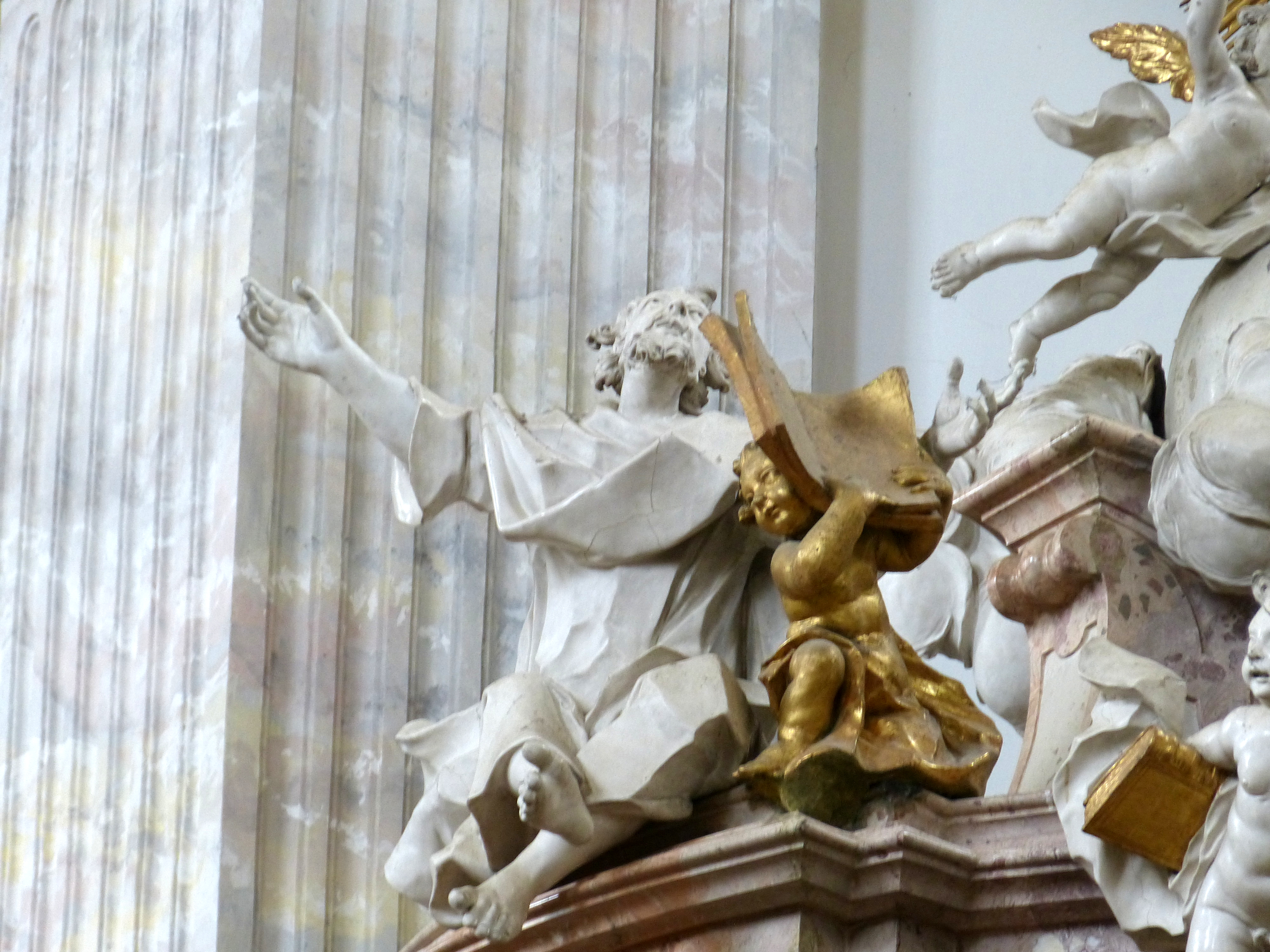
Close view of sculpted decoration

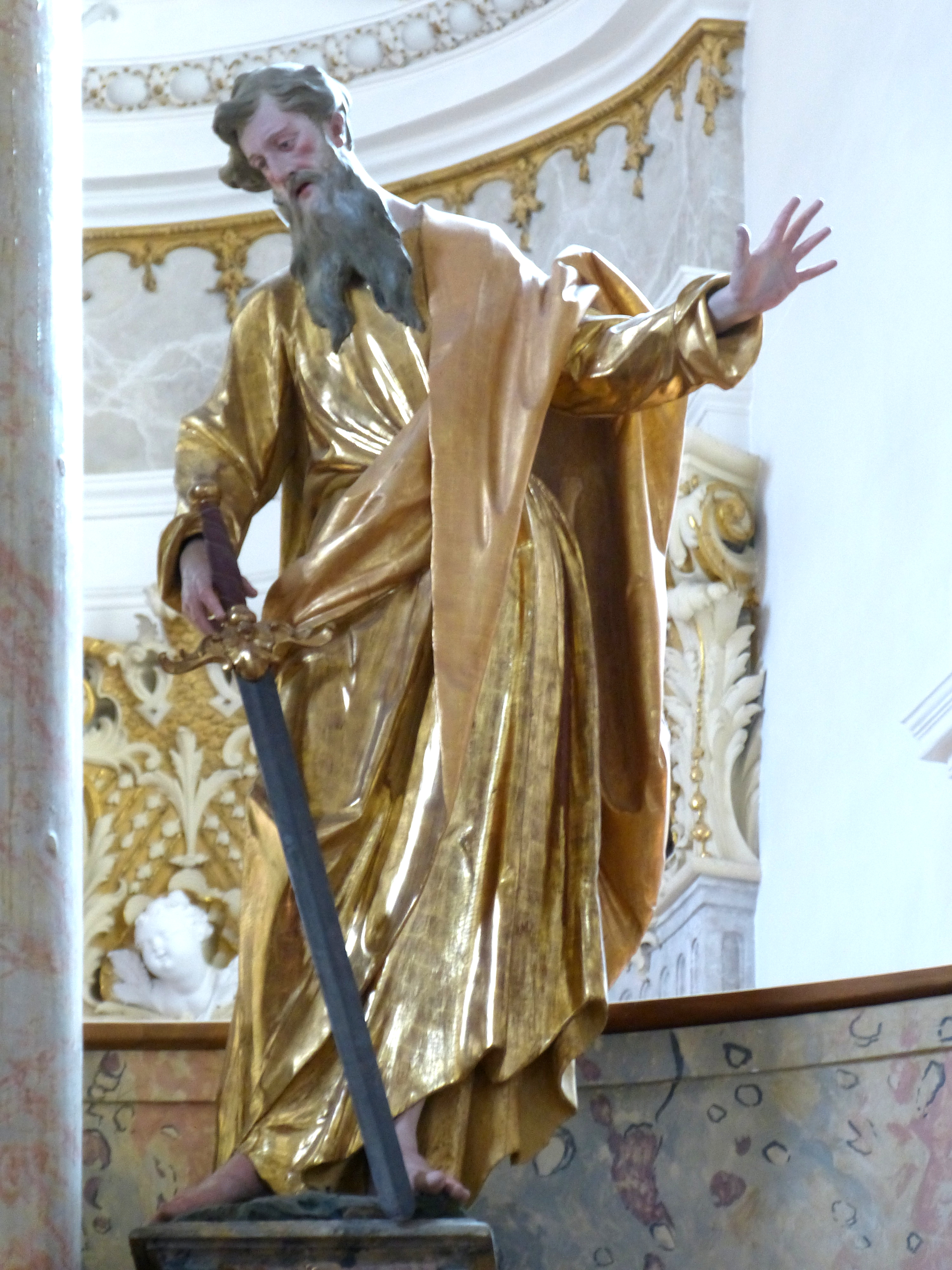
High altar with Paul

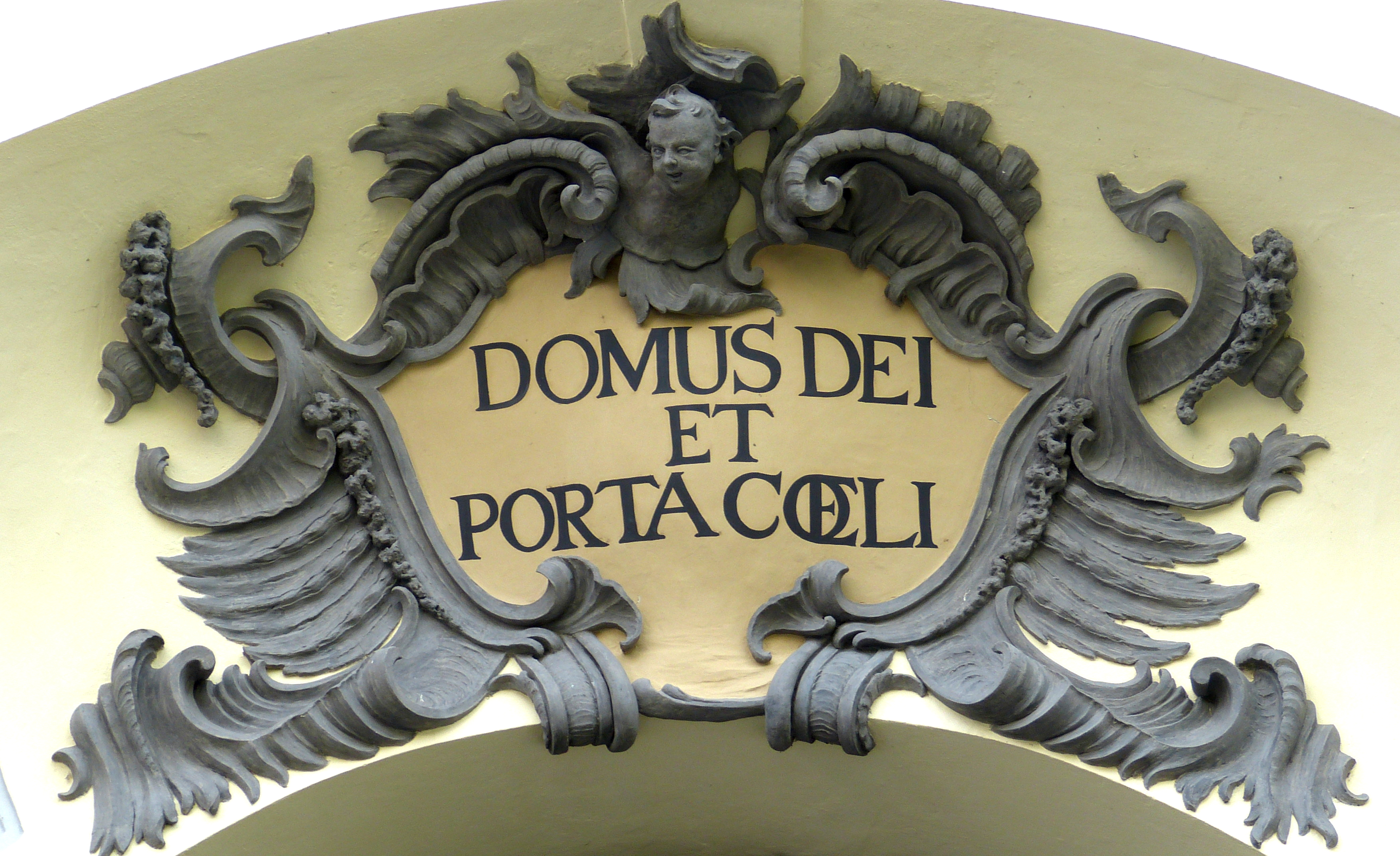
Entryway inscription

== Literature ==
- Albert Bücker: 900 Jahre Pfarrei, 700 Jahre Kloster Fürstenzell. Kloster, Fürstenzell 1975.
- Norbert Lieb, Josef Sagmeister: Ehem. Zisterzienserabtei-Kirche Fürstenzell. Reihe: Kleine Kunstführer. Schnell und Steiner, 2003.
- Rainer A. Roth, Josef Sagmeister: Vom Krummstab zum Bayerischen Löwen – 1803: die Säkularisation des Klosters Fürstenzell. Hrsg. Volksbildungswerk Fürstenzell e.V. GraphX Werbestudio, Fürstenzell 2003.
- August Wieschemeyer (Text): Die Bibliothek im Kloster Fürstenzell und ihre Atlanten. Kloster, Fürstenzell 1979.
