= Aldersbach Abbey =

Cistercian abbey in Germany

Coordinates: 48°35′16″N 13°05′10″E

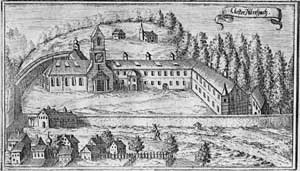
Engraving of Aldersbach Abbey from the "Churbaierische Atlas" of Anton Wilhelm Ertl, 1687

Aldersbach Abbey (German: Kloster Aldersbach) is a former Cistercian monastery in the community of Aldersbach in the district of Passau in the valley of the Vils, Lower Bavaria, Germany.

== History ==
It was founded in 1127 by Saint Otto, Bishop of Bamberg, as a community of Augustinian Canons, on a site near a church consecrated in 880 by Englmar, Bishop of Passau, in honour of Saint Peter. In 1146 Egilbert, the successor of Otto, gave the foundation and a new church of Our Lady to the Cistercians, and after the departure of the canons, Abbot Sefried, with monks from Ebrach Abbey, took possession.

Under Cistercian rule Aldersbach flourished for more than six centuries. It was famous for the rigour of its religious discipline and exerted a wide influence. From here were founded the religious houses of Fürstenfeld (1263), Fürstenzell (1274), and Gotteszell (1285). The monks cultivated the soil and devoted themselves to the pastoral work of their own and in the neighbouring churches dependent upon the abbey. Nor did they neglect the pursuit of learning: the first abbot, Sefried, formed the nucleus of the library to which valuable additions were made by his successors.

During the Thirty Years' War which followed the Reformation, the abbey was pillaged and almost entirely abandoned. The library however escaped destruction, and under the abbots Matthew and Gebhard Horger the old régime was restored. Abbot Theobald II repaired the injuries sustained during the wars of the Spanish and Austrian Successions.

The abbey was suppressed on 1 April 1803 during the secularisation of Bavaria; the monks then numbered forty. The buildings were sold, and the abbey church was converted into a parish church, while the monks engaged in parish work or teaching. The library became a part of the Bayerische Staatsbibliothek at Munich.

== Abbots ==
Aldersbach was fortunate in its abbots. They maintained monastic discipline, furthered the interests of the abbey, and encouraged the pursuit of learning. Among the more prominent, besides those already mentioned, were Dietrich I (1239–53, 1258–77); Conrad (1308–36); John II, John III, and Wolfgang Marius, who is perhaps the best known. He had studied at Heidelberg, and was the author of several works. Father Stephan Wiest also became known later as a theologian. He taught at the University of Ingolstadt, of which he was rector from 1787 to 1788, and six years later returned to Aldersbach, where he died in 1797.

== Brewery ==
Brewing was first recorded in the monastery in 1268. The abbey brewery passed in 1811 into the hands of Johann Adam von Aretin, whose family still own it (as at 2007) as the Brauerei Aldersbach.
