= Churbaierische Atlas =

17th century Bavarian atlas

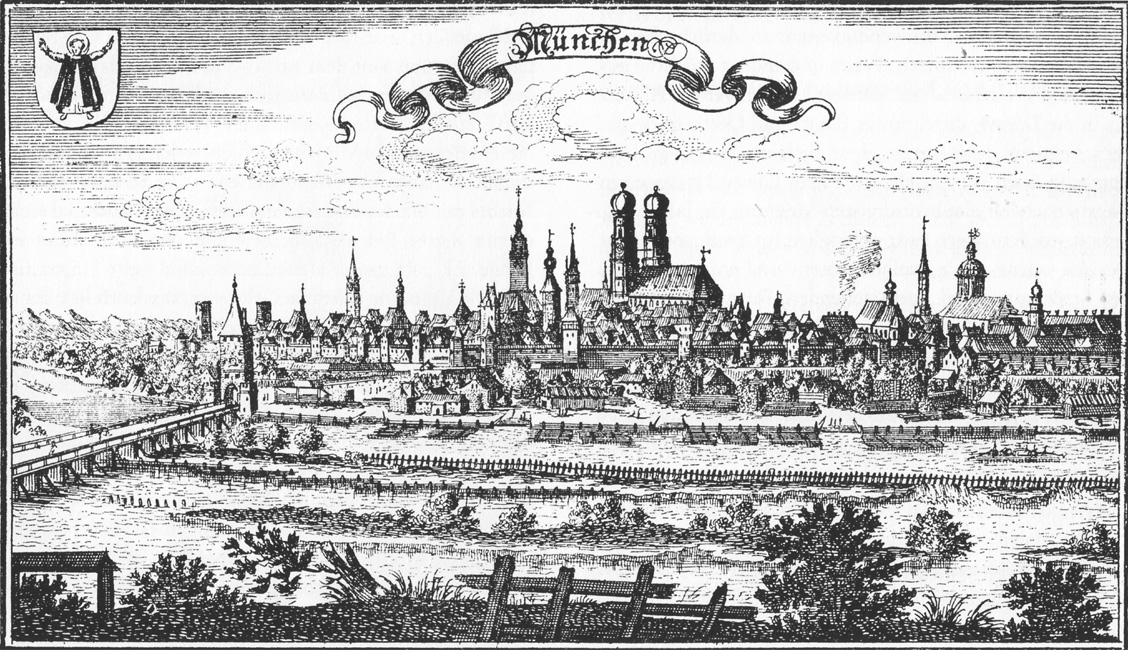
City view of Munich from the Kurbayerischer Atlas

The Churbaierische Atlas (German: Kurbayerischer Atlas) is a geographical description of the Electorate of Bavaria from the late 17th century.

The full original title is:

Chur-Bayerischer Atlas / Das ist: Eine Grundrichtige, Historische, und mit vielen schönen Kupfern und Land-Karten gezierte Abbildung, aller in dem hochberühmten Chur-Hertzogthum Ober- und Nieder-Bayern, auch in der Obern Pfalz ligenden vortrefflichen Städten, Märkt, und theils Schlösser, samt deroselben Ursprung, Fortpflanzung und andere merkwürdigste Bayrische Denk-Sachen, alle aus dem unverfälschten Grund der Antiquität enthalten.

Beschrieben und Verfasset von ANTONIO GUILIELMO Ertl, der Rechten Licenciat, Chur-Bayerischen Hofgerichts-Advocaten, und des Lobwürdigen Closters Steingadten Ober-Richtern zu Widtraeltingen, auch andern Schwäbischen Dorffschafften.

Which in English, translates to

Chur-Bayerischer Atlas / That is: A fundamentally correct, historical, and with many beautiful copper and country maps decorated illustration, of all in the highly famous Chur Duchy of Upper and Lower Bavaria, also in the Upper Palatinate's excellent cities, markets, and castles, together with their origin, reproduction, and other most remarkable Bavarian memorabilia, all contained on the unadulterated grounds of antiquity.

Described and written by ANTONIO GUILIELMO Ertl, of the right Licenciat, Chur-Bayerischen Court Advocates, and of the praiseworthy cloister Steingadten Senior judges of Widtraeltingen, also other Swabian villages.

The work first appeared in 1687 with a description of the towns, markets and castles of Bavaria. A new two-volume edition was published in 1690, with the addition of volume 2, which also included Bavarian monasteries, abbeys, provostries and convents. The copperplate engravings are by Johann Ulrich Krauß (1655-1719). The Munich jurist Anton Wilhelm Ertl (1654-1715) - at this time chief judge of Steingaden Abbey in Wiedergeltingen - wrote the text. Further editions were published in 1698, 1703, and 1705.

== Gallery ==
=== Towns ===
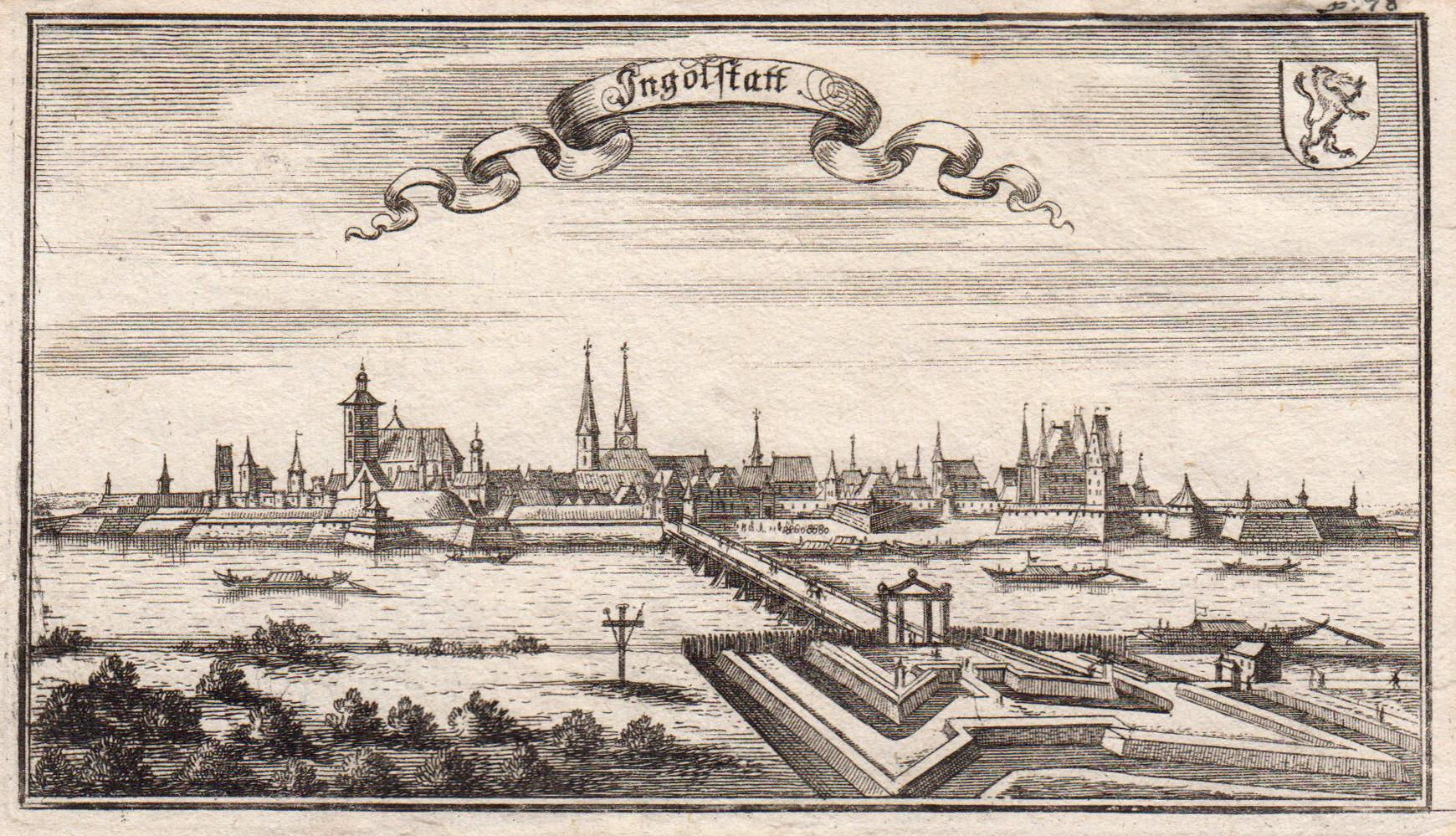
Copper engraving of Ingolstadt

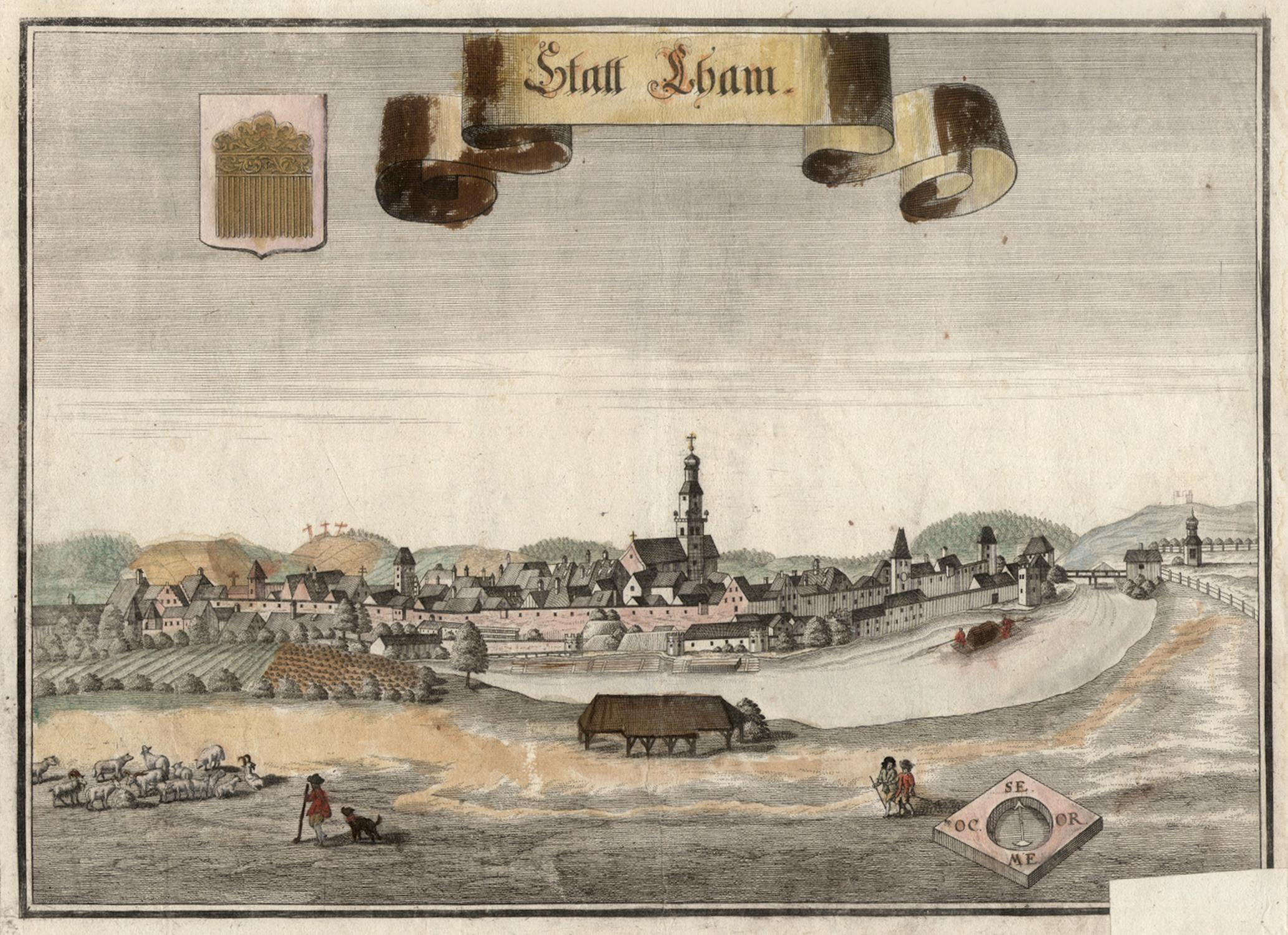
Cham

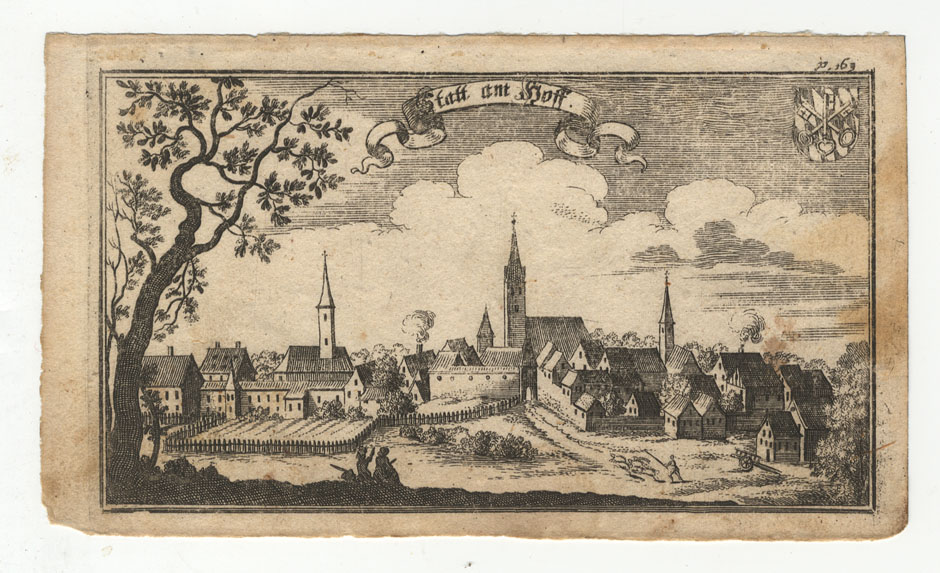
Stadtamhof

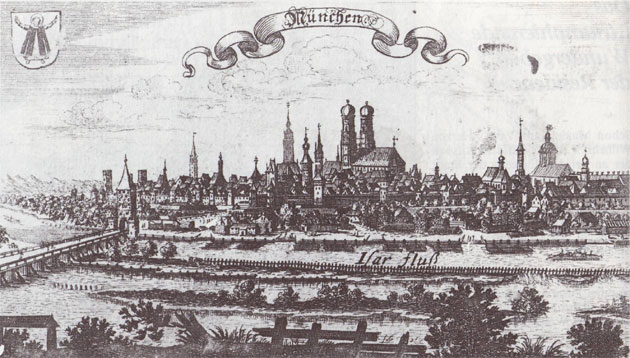
Münich in 1687

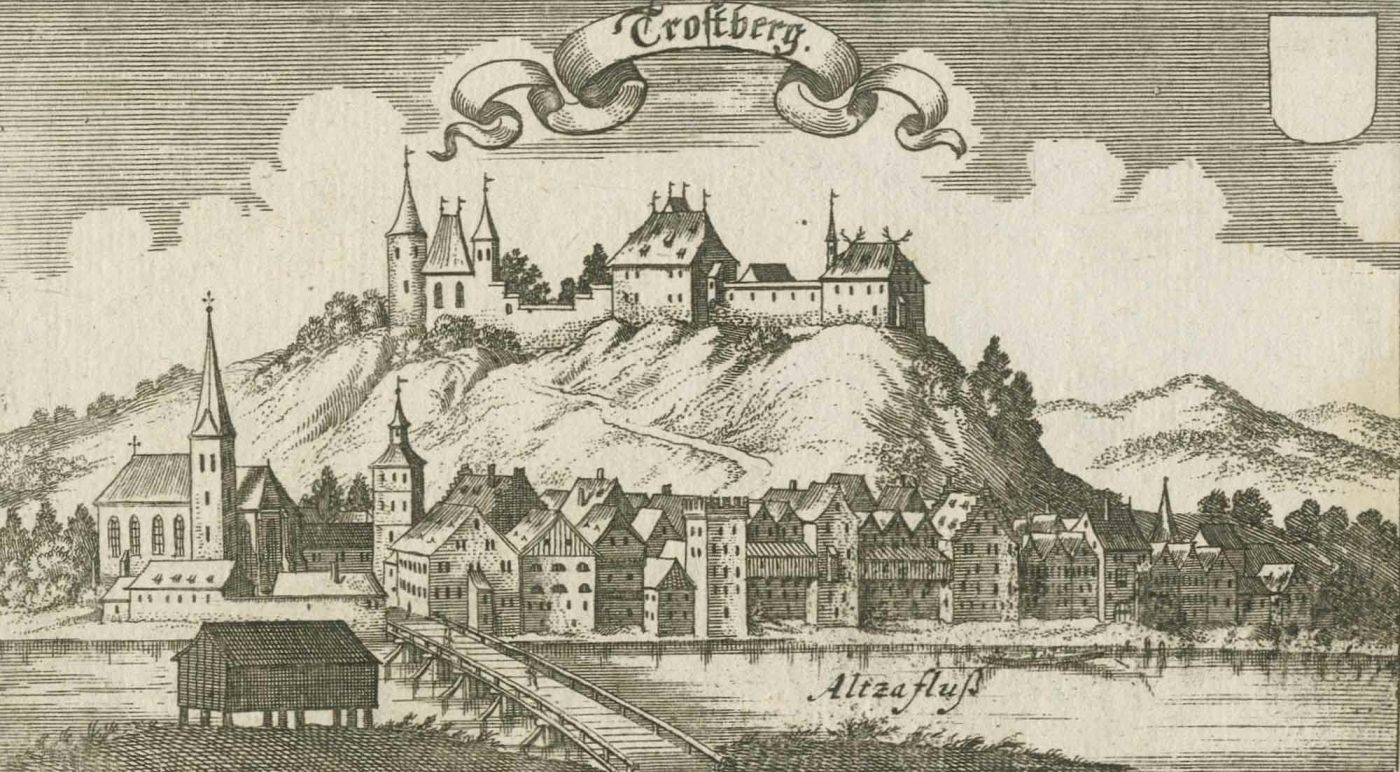
Trostberg, including view of Trostberg Castle

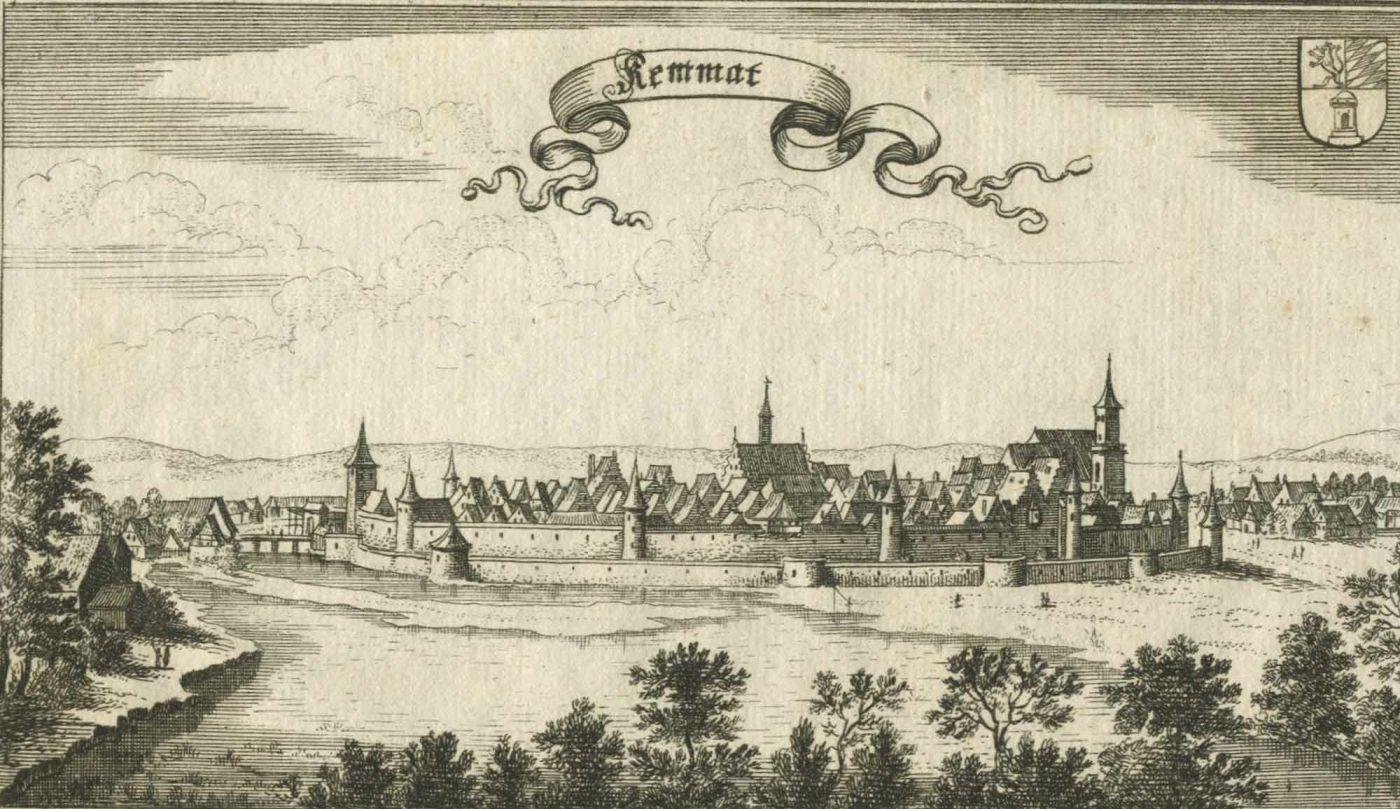
Kemnath

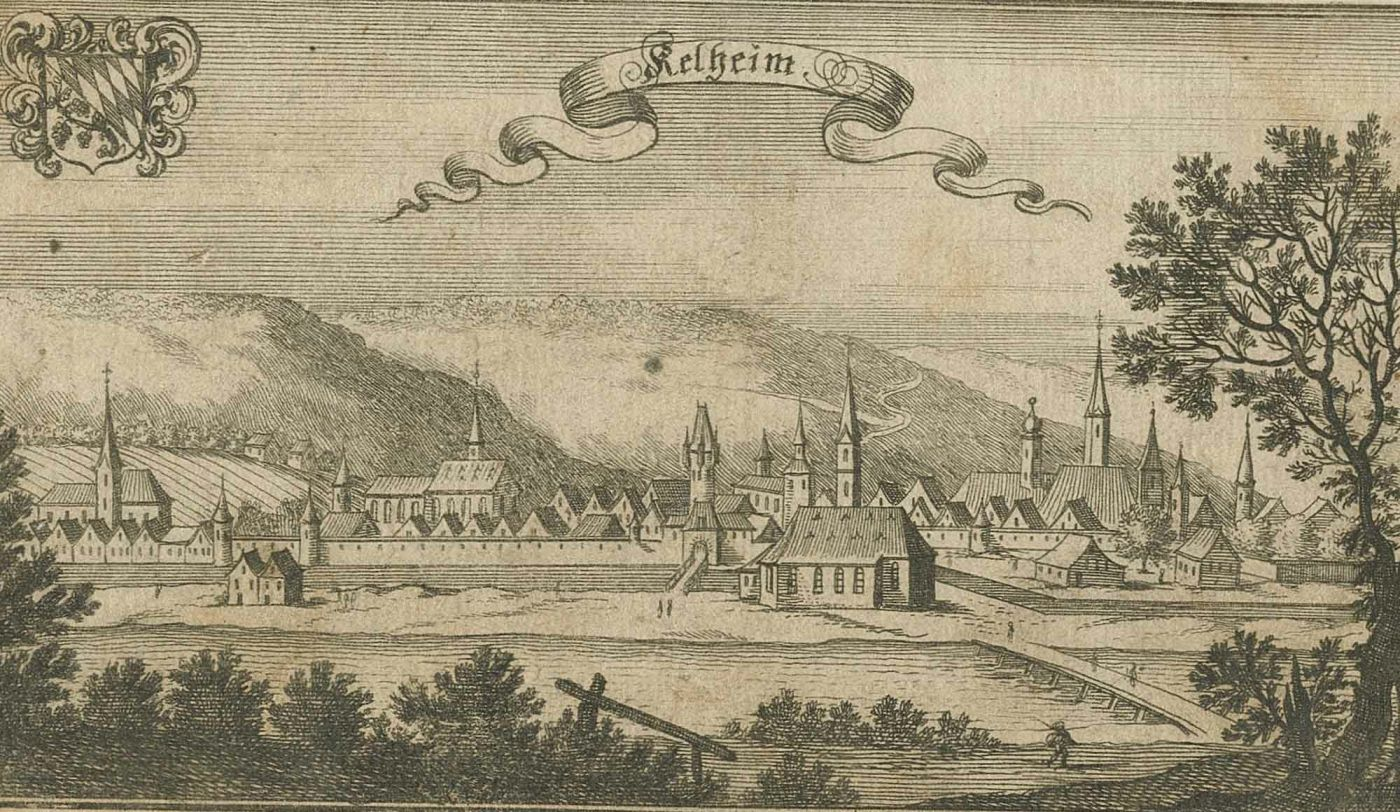
Kelheim

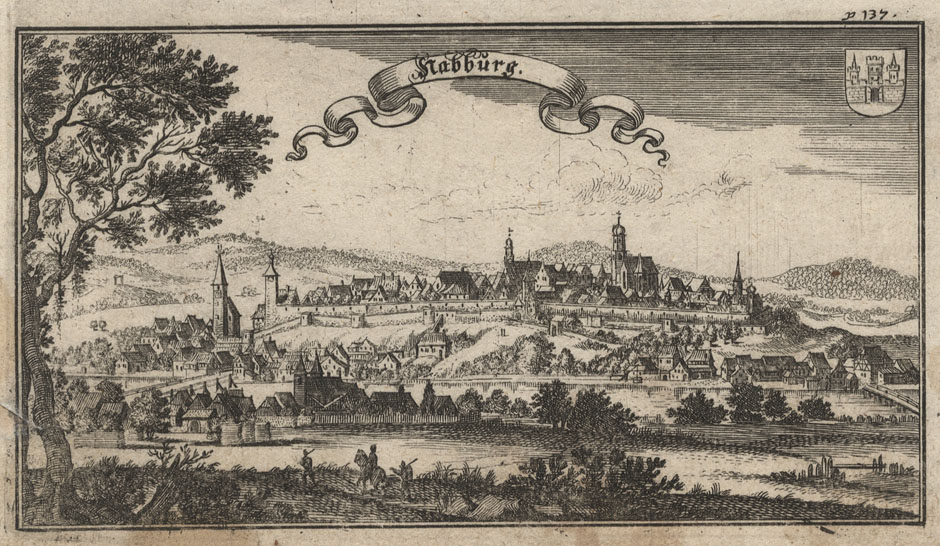
Nabburg

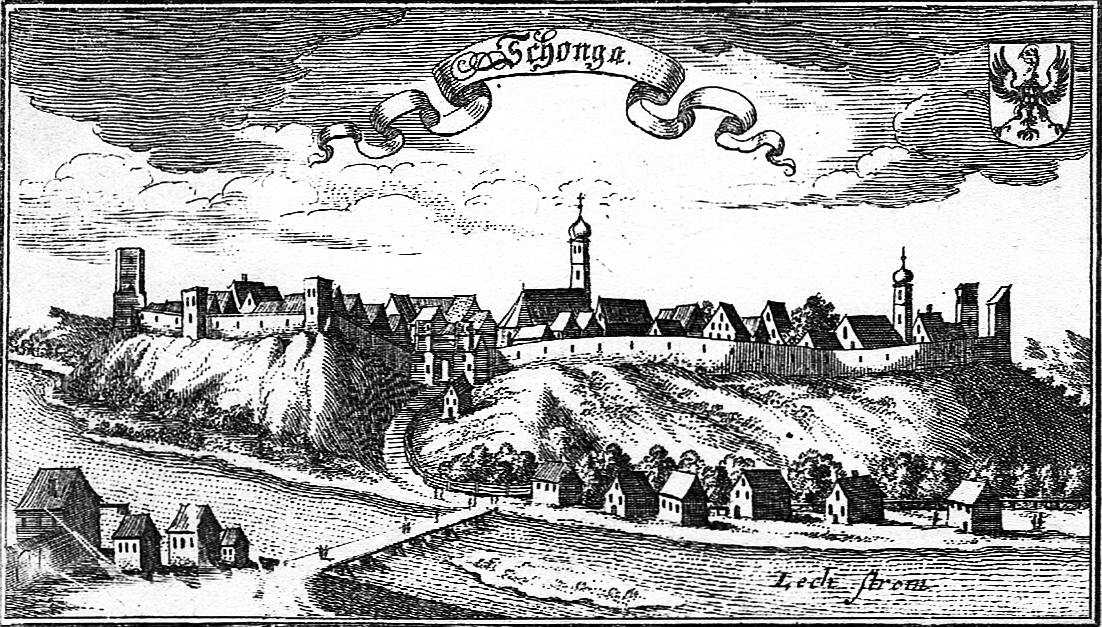
Schongau

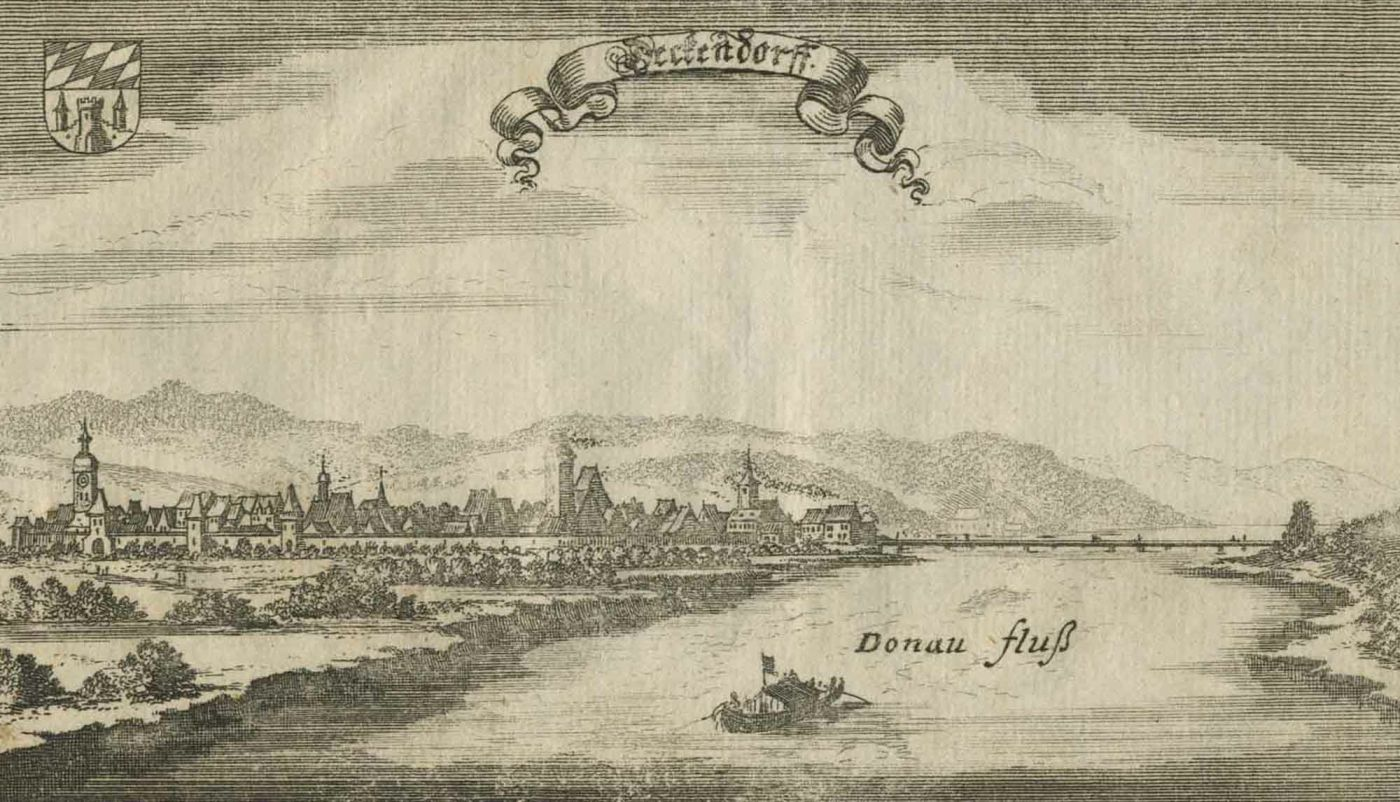
Deggendorf

=== Monasteries ===
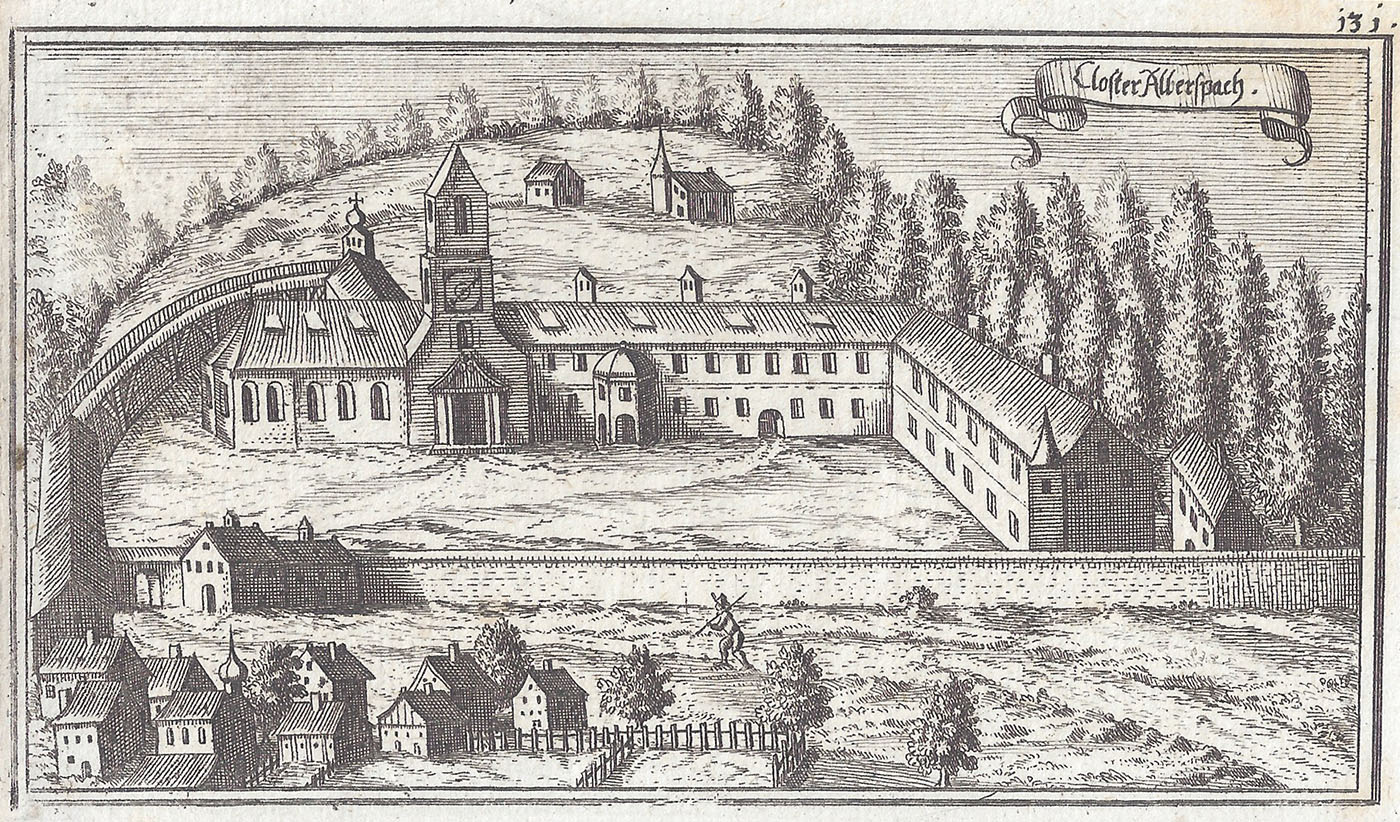
Aldersbach Abbey

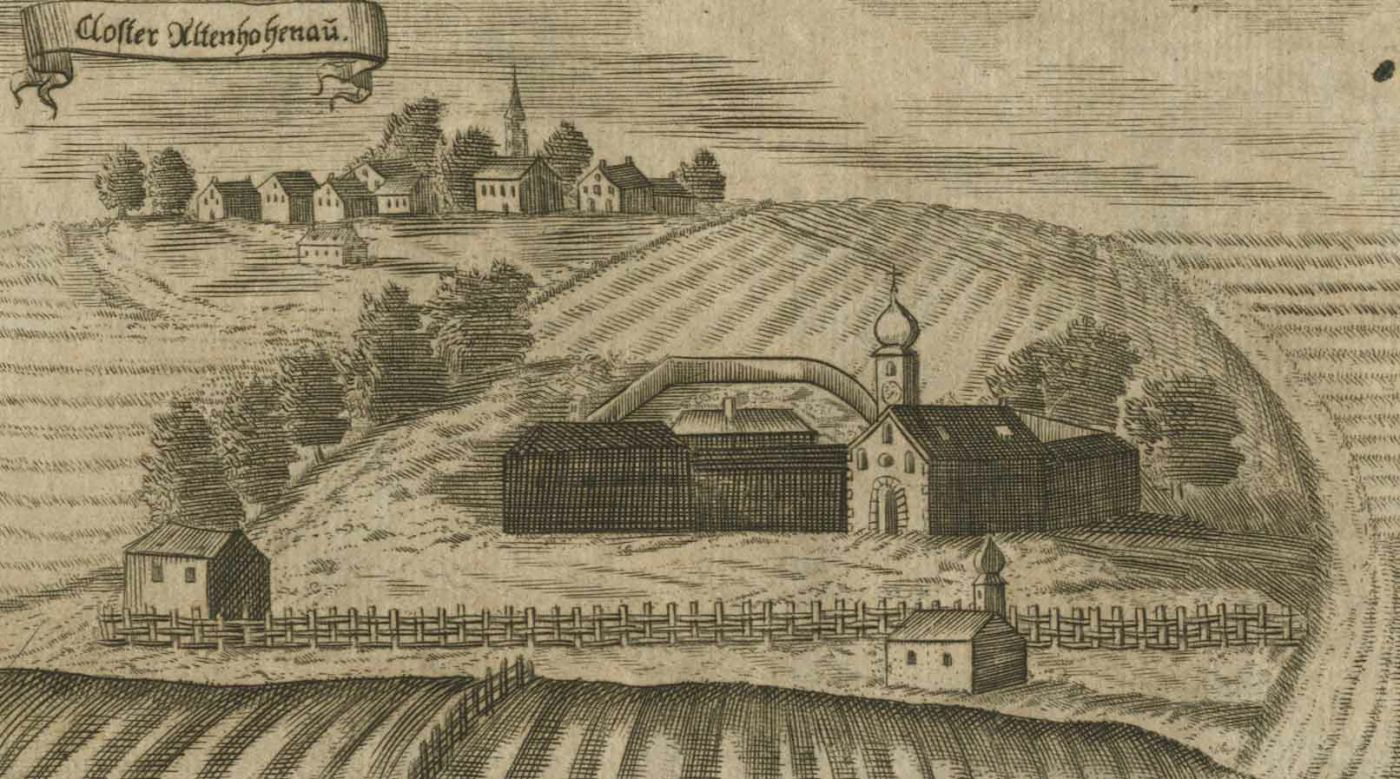
Altenhohenau Abbey

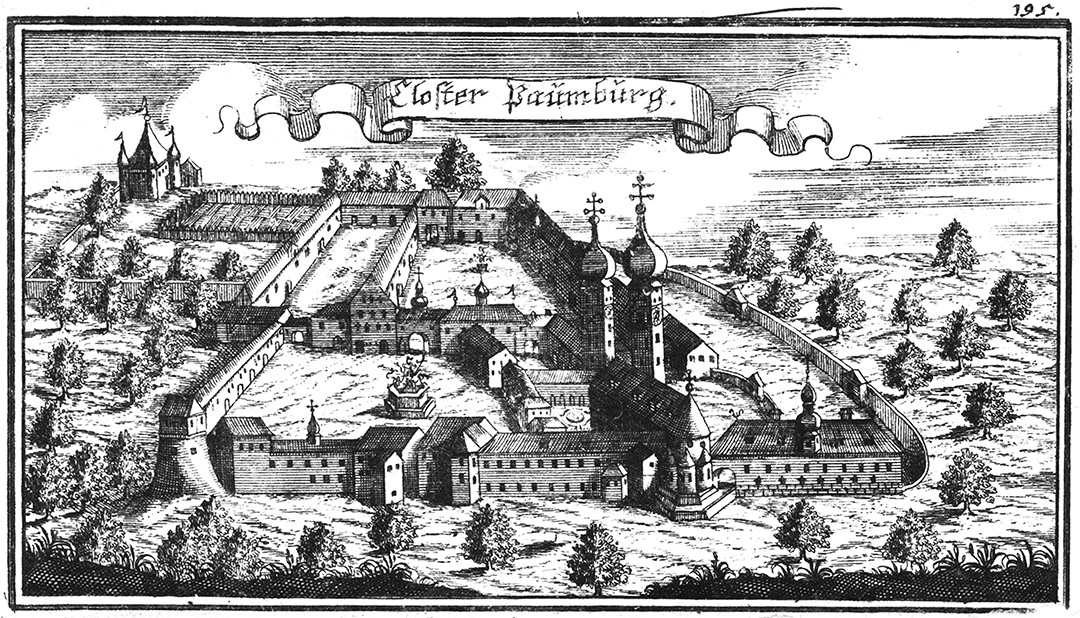
Baumburg Abbey

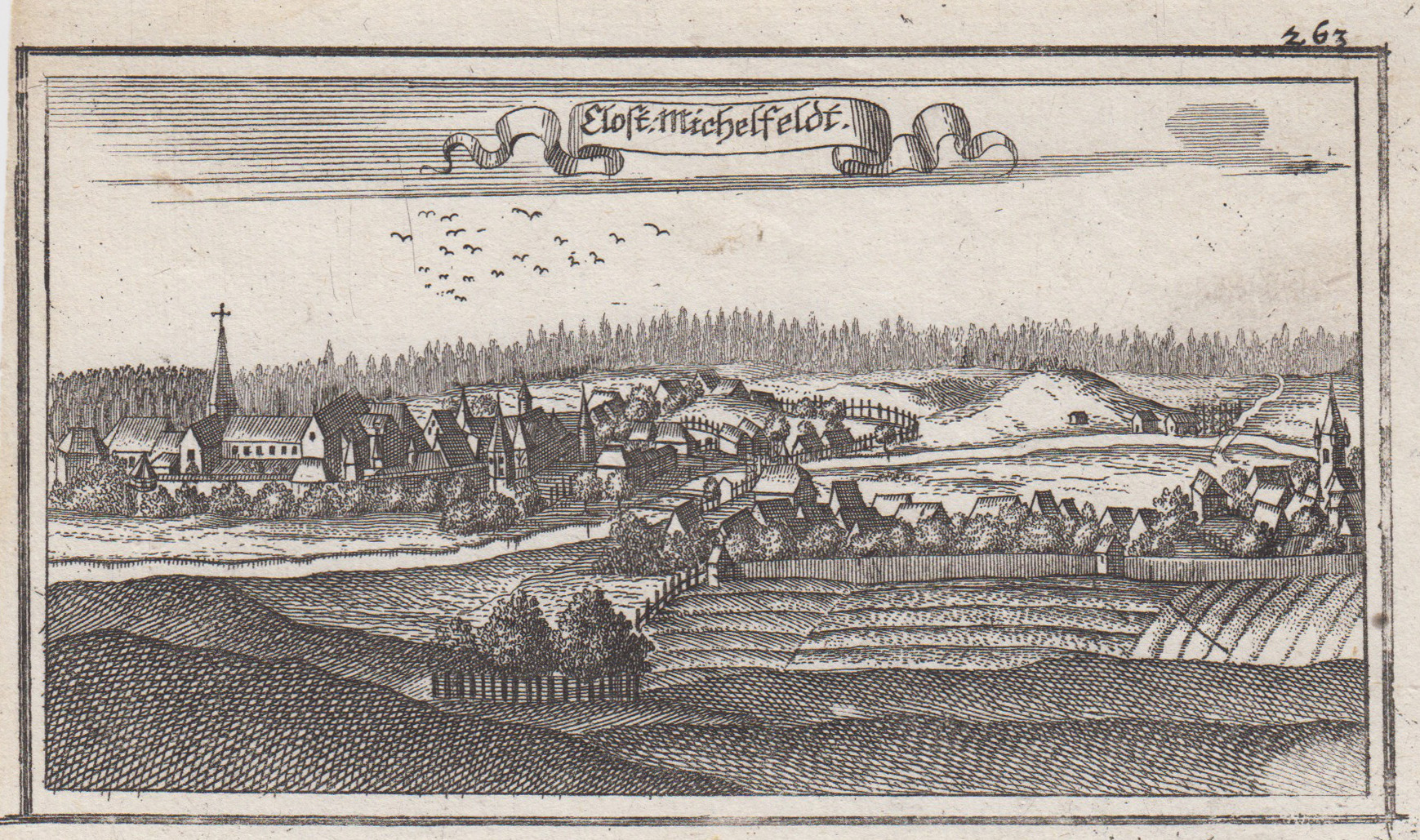
Michelfeld Abbey

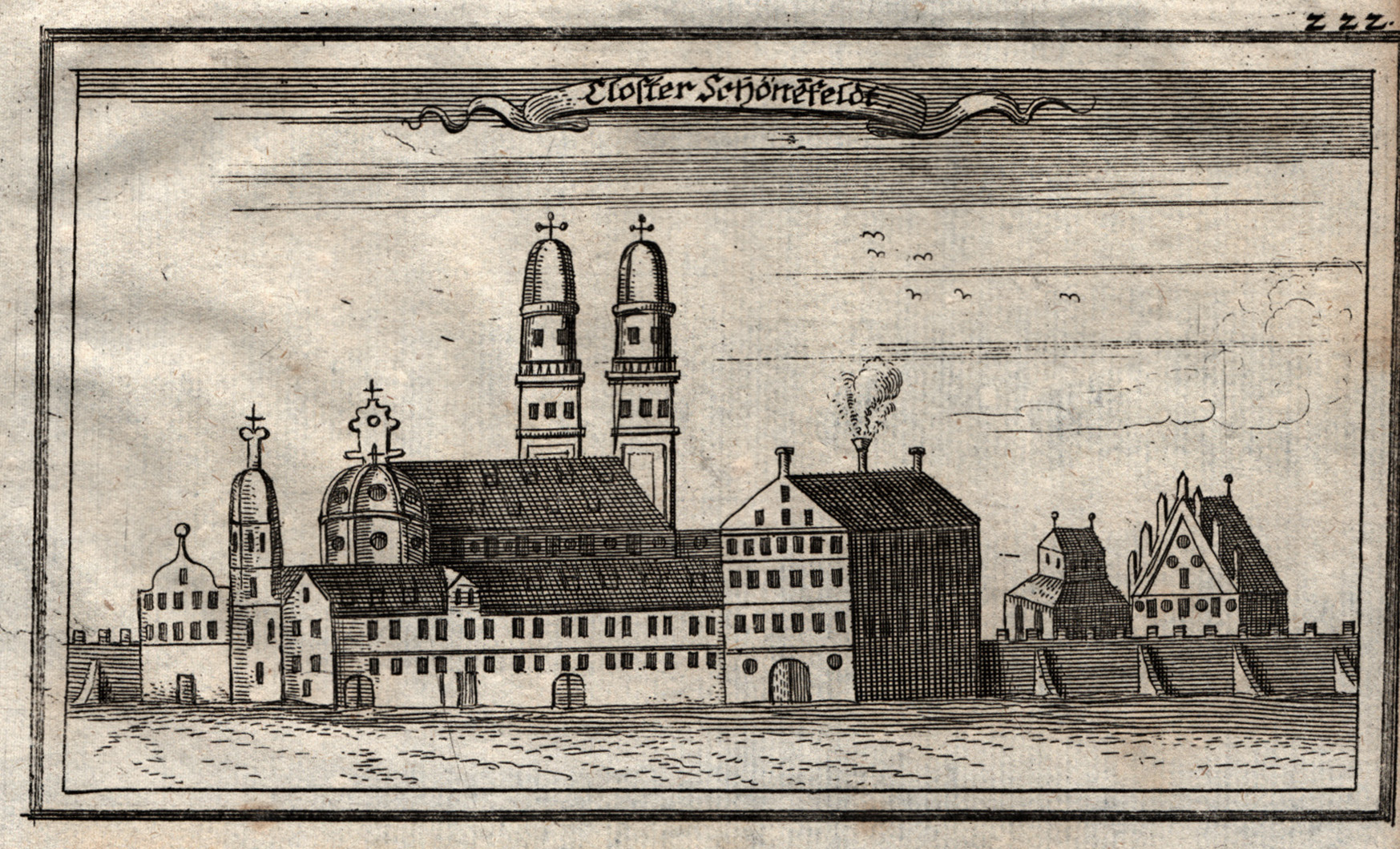
Schönenfeld Abbey

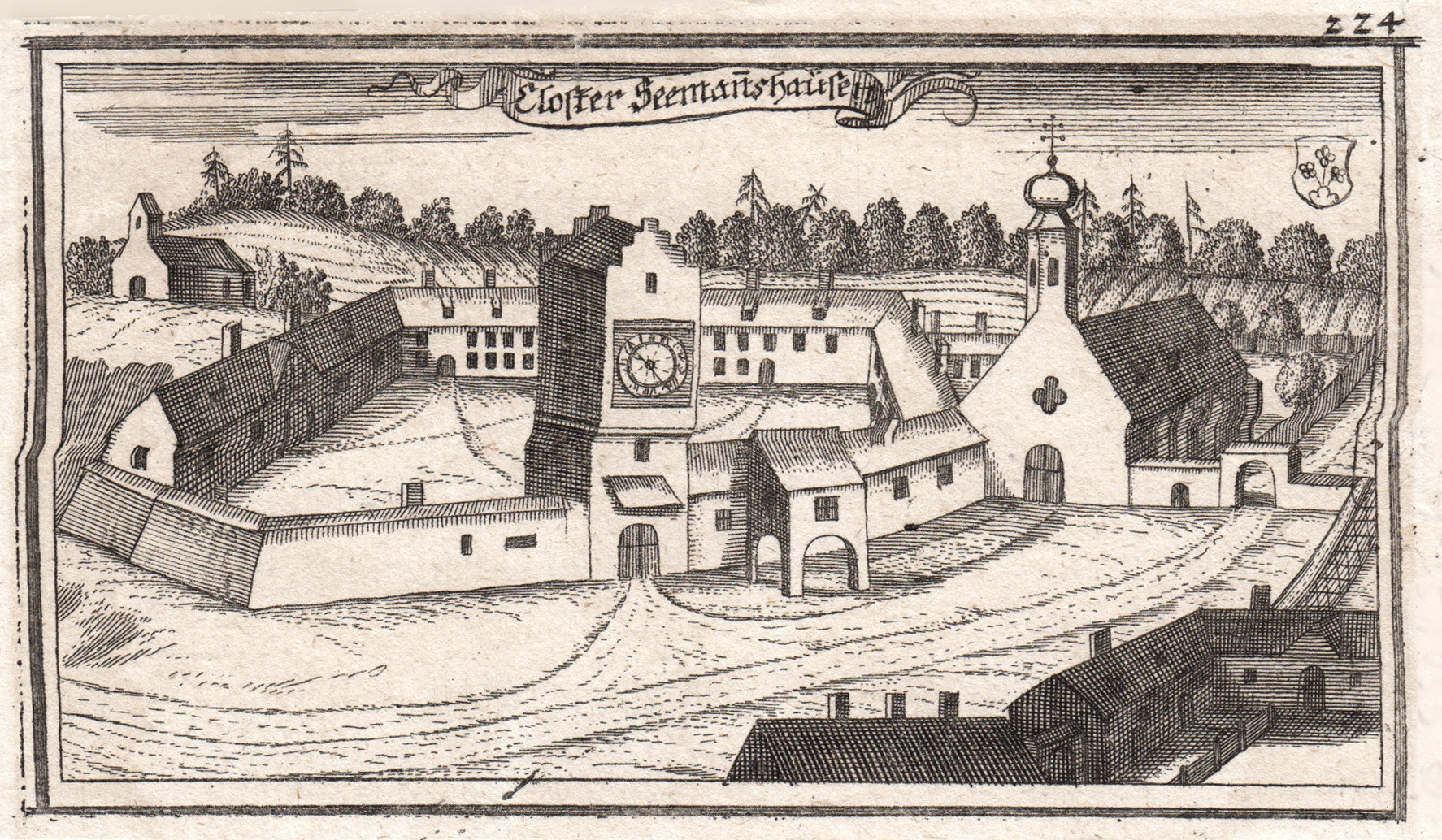
Seemannshausen Abbey

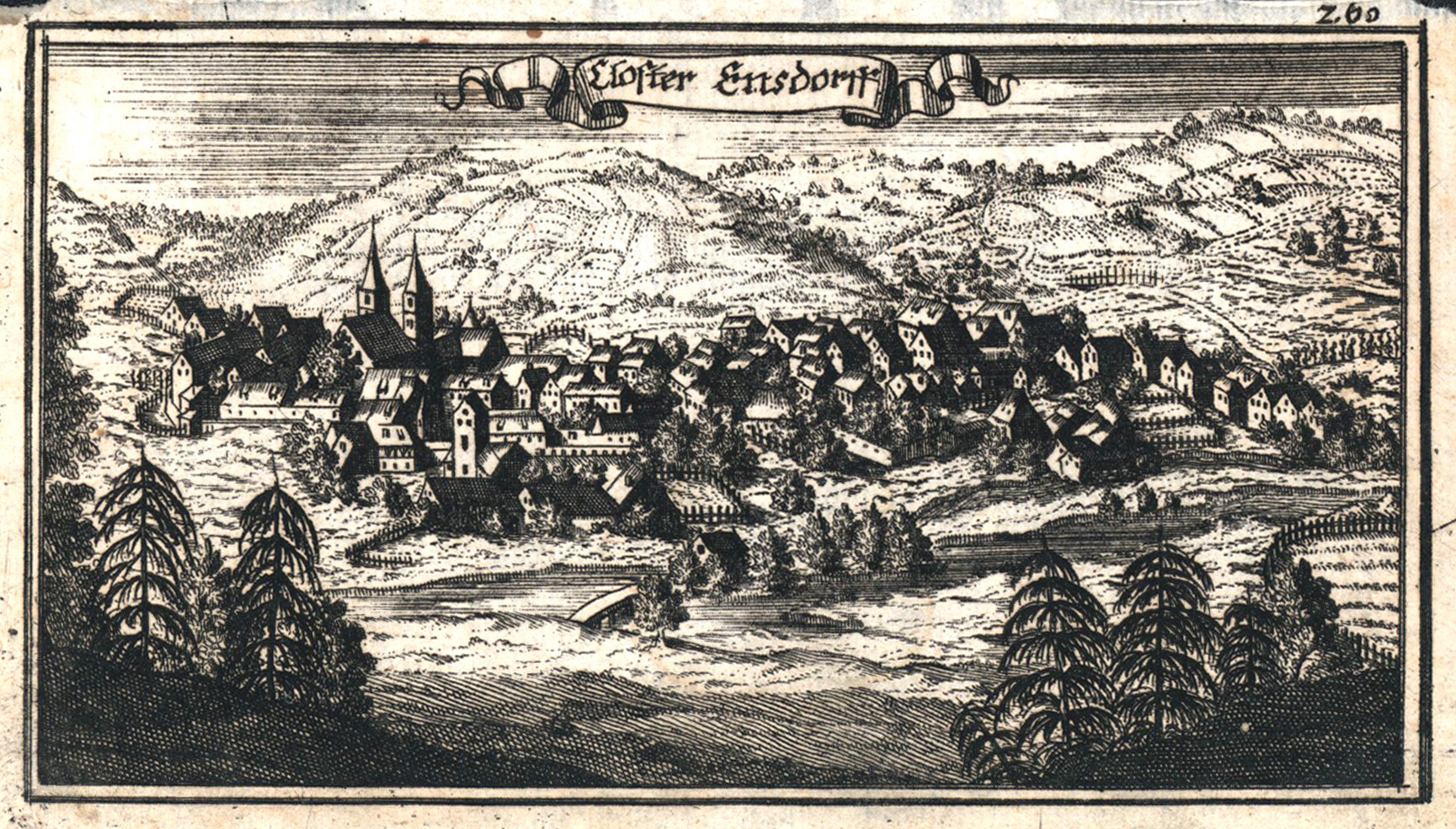
Ensdorf Abbey

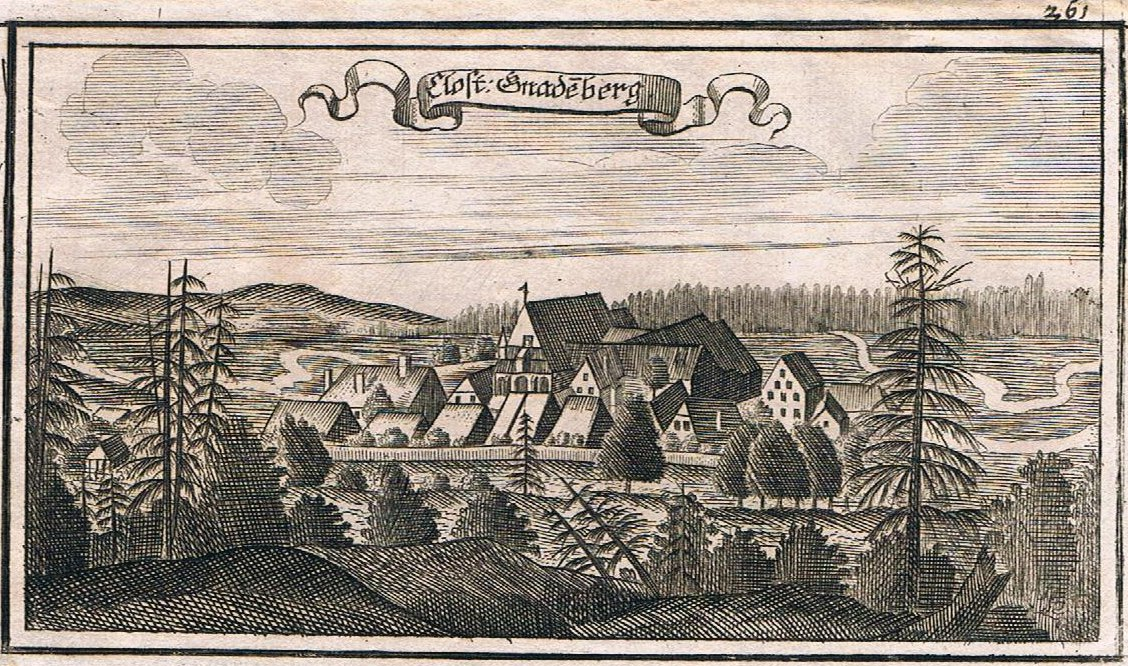
Gnadenberg Abbey

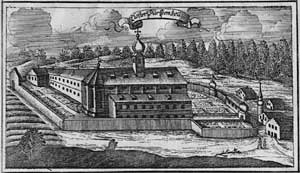
Fürstenzell Abbey

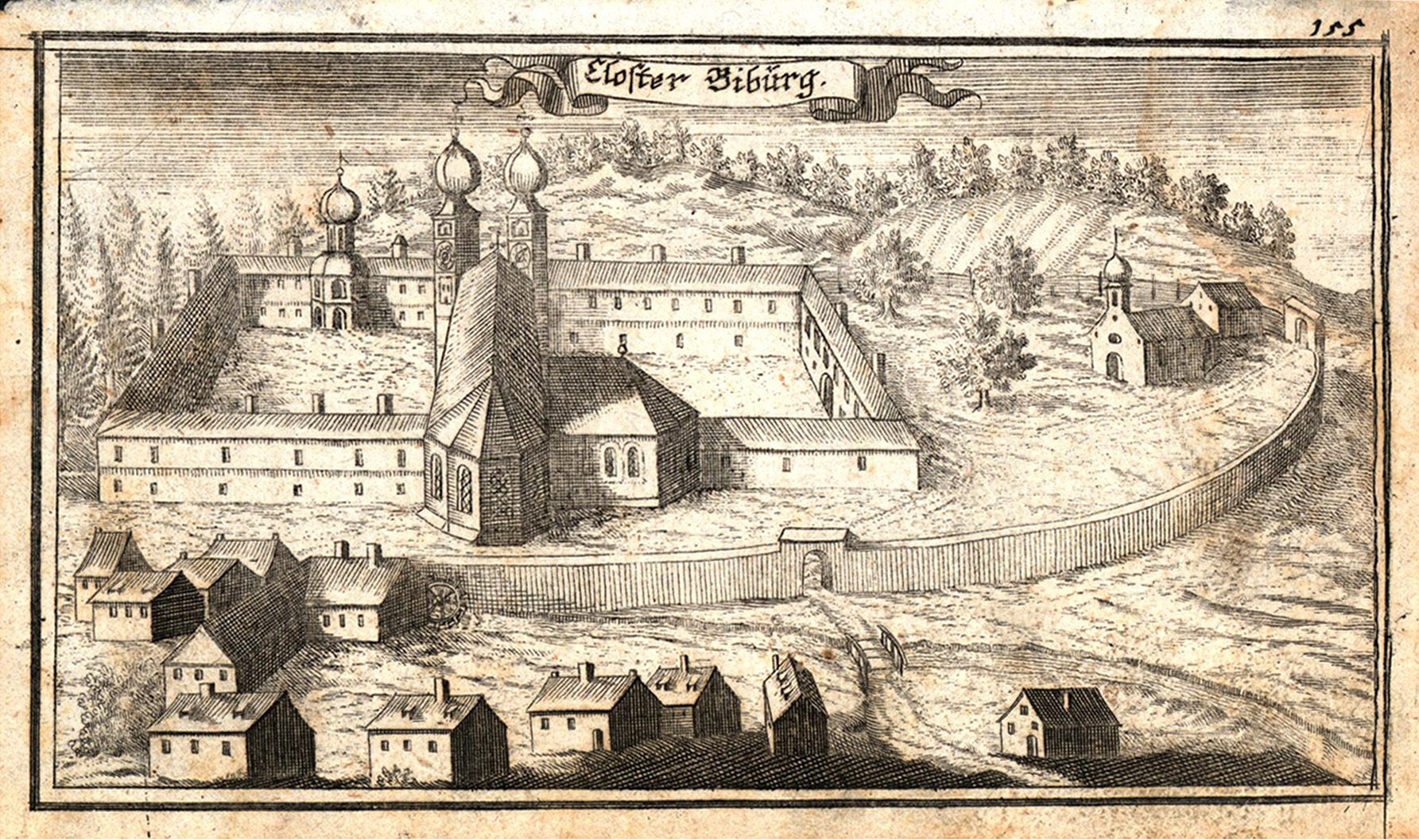
Biburg Abbey
