= Aldersbach brewery =

Brewery in Germany

Aldersbach Brewery
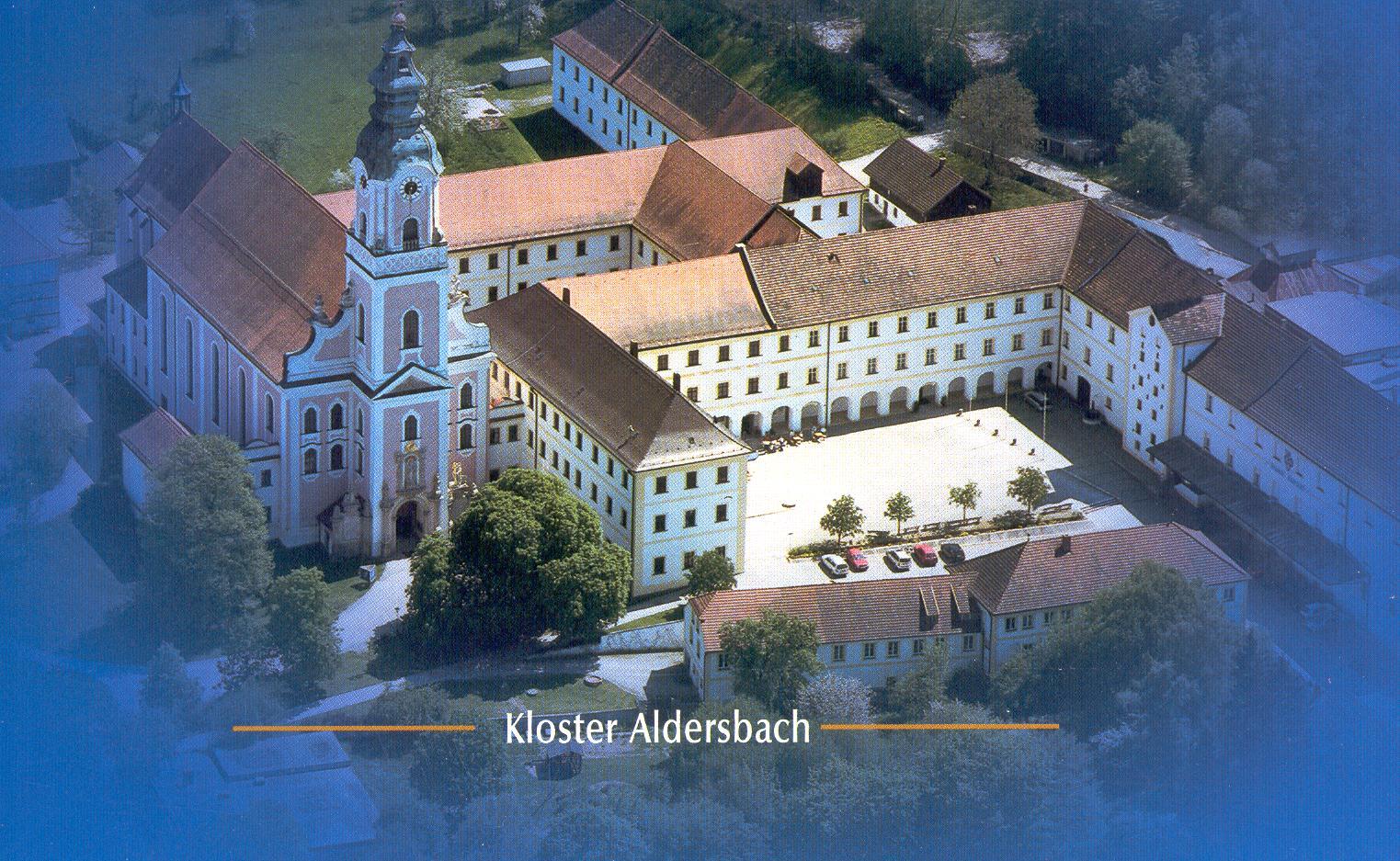
- Interactive map of Aldersbach Brewery
- Location: Aldersbach, Bavaria, Germany
- Coordinates: 48°35′14″N 13°5′10″E
- Opened: 1268
- Annual production volume: 90,000 hectolitres (77,000 US bbl)
- Owner: G. Adam Freiherr von Aretin
- Website: www.aldersbacher.de

Active beers
Name	Type
Kloster Dunkel	Dunkel
Kloster Weisse Hell	Helles
Aldersbacher Aurum	Barley wine
Freiherrn Pils	Pilsner
Aldersbacher Zwickl	Kellerbier

Seasonal beers
Name	Type
Festbier	Pale lager
Rubin-Bock	Bock
Kloster Weisse Spezial	Berliner Weisse

The Aldersbach brewery (German Brauerei Aldersbach) is a traditional medium-sized brewery in Aldersbach, Lower Bavaria, opened in the 13th century. It produces beer types such as Dunkel, Helles, and Pilsner, plus seasonal Bock and Pale lagers. In 2016, it won awards from the Bavarian Brewers Association and the Bavarian State Beer Exhibition.

== History ==
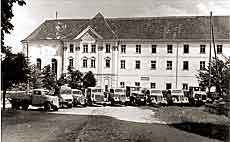
Aldersbach brewery

The origins of the Aldersbach brewery, in the Klosterwinkel region close to Passau, go back to the High Middle Ages. In 1146, monks from Ebrach founded the Aldersbach Abbey. In a short time the place grew into an economic, cultural, and spiritual center.

Soon after the monastery was founded, the monks started brewing beer. As early as 1268, the brewery was documented in an arbitration letter from Count Albert von Hals. This makes the Aldersbach brewery one of the oldest breweries in the world. Nevertheless, the main drink until the 16th century was wine, which was also grown in the area around Aldersbach. Climate changes and phylloxera disasters put an end to viticulture and beer became the main and popular drink in Bavaria. Until then, the monastery breweries were primarily responsible for the production of beer and the supply of the population, but from this point onward, castle breweries were established in many places, some of which still exist today.

In the 17th century there was government intervention in the brewing rights. Even Aldersbach had to fear for its brewing rights, since the corresponding certificate was lost in the Thirty Years' War. In 1644, the monastery was re-confirmed by Elector Maximilian I. The increasing consumption of beer made it necessary to build a new brewhouse in 1734. The brewery museum is housed in this building today. In 1780 a new beer cellar was built.

Secularization hit Aldersbach hard: in 1803 the monastery was dissolved and the brewery was initially sold to a beer brewer from Passau. A few years later, in 1811, Johann Adam von Aretin acquired the monastery brewery; as early as 1806 he had bought forest and arable land around Heidelberg Palace. The brewery is still owned by the family to this day.

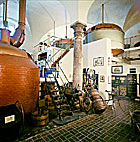
Aldersbach Brewery Museum

In the course of the 19th century many smaller breweries in the area were bought up; Further acquisitions were made after the First World War and in the 1950s and 1960s, including the breweries in Gossersdorf and Konzell (Straubing-Bogen district) and a brewery in Lam (Cham (district)). The Aldersbach brewery, which has been run as a GmbH & Co KG since 1 January 2005, is still owned by the von Aretin family and is one of the most successful breweries in Bavaria today. In the summer of 2008, large parts of the Passau Peschl Brewery was bought, and since then the Aldersbach brewery has been supplying the former customers of Peschl-Bräu with their beverages. The Aldersbacher Bräustüberl is particularly well-known, as you can bring your own snacks there.

In 2016, the Bavarian State Exhibition "Beer in Bavaria" took place in Aldersbach. Both the historical and the modern brewery part could be visited. In 2018, the Aldersbach brewery celebrated its 750th anniversary.

== Products ==
As of 2020:

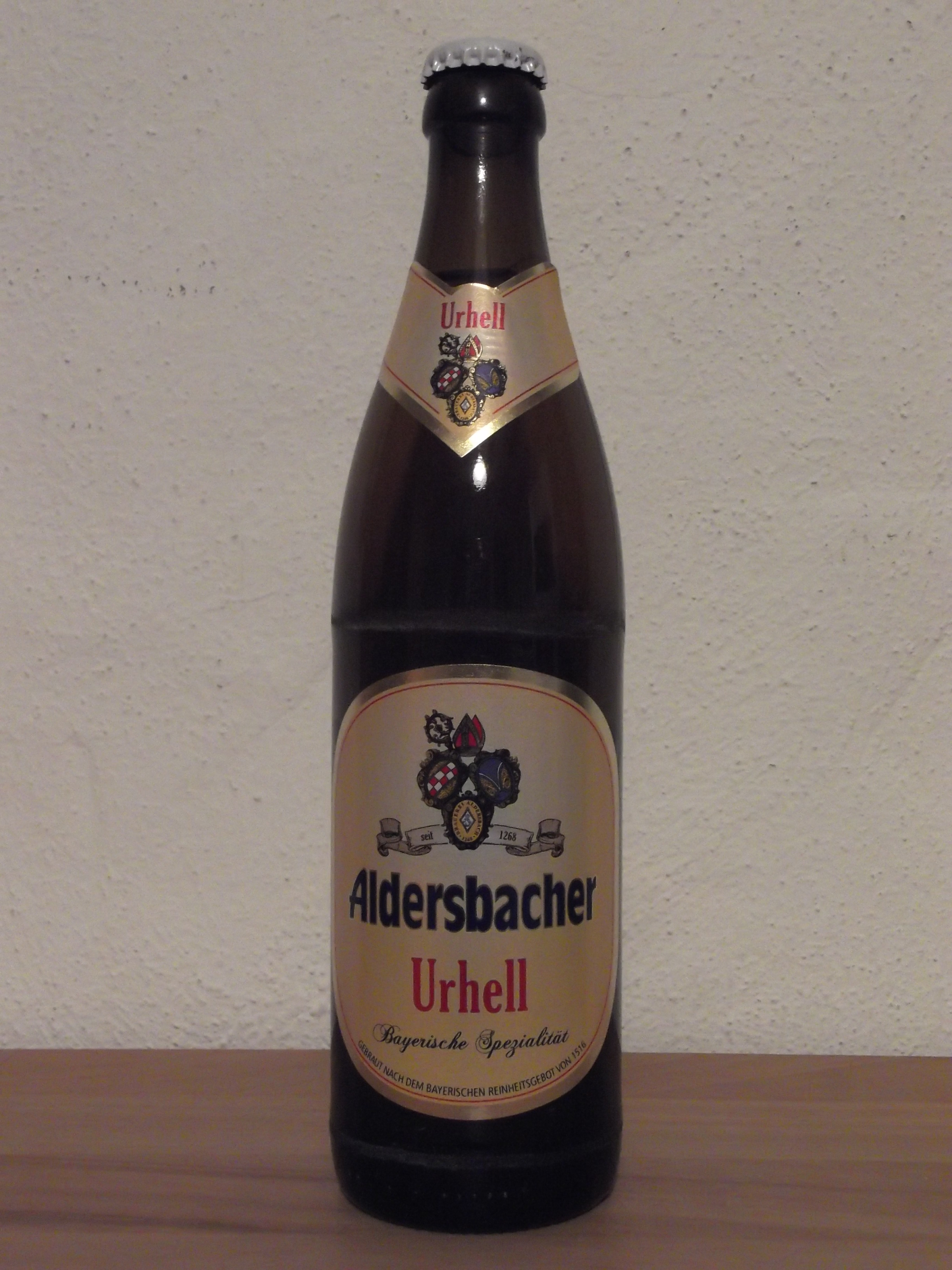
Aldersbacher Urhell

=== Beers ===
- Alkoholfrei
- Urhell
- Ursprung
- Kloster Dunkel
- Freiherrn Pils
- Klosterhell
- Kloster Weisse Dunkel
- Medium Hell
- Kloster Weisse Leicht
- Kloster Weisse Hell
- Radler
- Zwicklbier
- Kloster Weisse Alkoholfrei
- Urhell RETRO

=== Soft drinks ===
- Mineralwasser spritzig
- Mineralwasser medium
- Apfel Schorle
- Sport mix
- Fresh Cola
- ACE
- Isosport
- Frischgeist Citron
- Frischgeist Zitrone
- Frischgeist Orange
- Light
- Apfel Orange Himbeer

== Awards ==
In 2016, the brewery received the Golden Beer Idea award from the Bavarian Brewers Association and the Bavarian Hotel and Restaurant Association, and the House of Bavarian History award from the Bavarian State Beer Exhibition.

== See also ==
- List of brewing companies in Germany
