= Anton Wilhelm Ertl =

Anton Wilhelm Ertl (10 September 1654, Munich – c.1715) was a German lawyer and geographer.

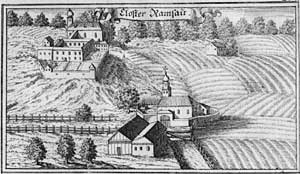
Copperplate of the Monastery Ramsau by Johann Ulrich Kraus from the "Churbaierische Atlas" of Anton Wilhelm Ertl, (1687).

He studied law at Ingolstadt, and from around 1680, worked as a lawyer in the Munich court. He also served as a judge in the jurisdictions of various monasteries in Bavaria (from 1682). In 1705 he received the title of imperial counsellor and was a lawyer of the imperial equestrian order in Suebia.

He was the author of:

- Austriana Regina Arabiae (1688): A novel Ertl dedicated to Prince Joseph I (1678–1711).
- Chur-bayerischer Atlas (1687): An atlas with descriptions of Bavarian places of interest of which a short story accompanies engravings of the pertinent locations (engravings by Johann Ulrich Kraus).
- Relationes Curiosae Bavaricae (1685): A collection of anecdotes and character portrayals derived from Bavarian history.
