= Orgelbau Pieringer =

Austrian organ building company

Orgelbau Pieringer e.U.
- Company type: private company
- Industry: pipe organ manufacturing
- Founded: 1996 in Haag, Austria
- Founder: Johann Pieringer
- Headquarters: Holzleiten 4, A-3350 Haag, Austria
- Owner: Johann Pieringer
- Website: orgelbau-pieringer.at

Orgelbau Pieringer is an Austrian organ building company based in the city of Haag in Lower Austria. The founder and owner of the company is the Haag organ builder Johann Pieringer. Orgelbau Pieringer is a reputable organ workshop active for 25 years throughout Austria, Germany and Croatia, as well as a member of International Society of Organbuilders.

== History ==
After completing his professional training as an organ builder in a master workshop in Sankt Florian (Upper Austria) and successfully passing the final apprenticeship examination (1982) as well as master's examination (1989) for the organ building, Johann Pieringer set up his own business in 1996 and founded his organ workshop in the city of Haag. In 2003 the new workshop was built in Haag and the company headquarters moved from Johannesgasse to Holzleiten.

Orgelbau Pieringer mainly builds positive, house, concert and church organs designed in the classic mechanical manner of construction. Other services of the company also include cleaning and reconstruction, restoration of historical organs, intonation and tuning adapted to the organ's style and location, maintenance, organ relocation and transport as well as harmonium repairs. The company mostly operates throughout Austria, but has also realized some significant projects in Germany and Croatia, such as the construction of the organ in the choir chapel of the Frauenchiemsee monastery, the organ in the chapel of the Society of the Sisters of Our Lady in Zagreb and the organ in the parish church of Our Lady of Loreto in Zadar.

== Works (selection) ==
P = Pedal keyboard

City	Church	Year	Picture	Manuals	Stops	Remarks
Großgmain	Parish church	2000		II/P	17	The organ in the church of Großgmain is the only two-manual organ by Ludwig Mooser that has been almost completely preserved. During a restoration by Orgelbau Pieringer in 2000, the Dolce 4' and the Bassposaune 8' were reconstructed. The storage bellows were installed by Mauracher at the end of the nineteenth century.
Kematen an der Ybbs	Parish church	2000		II/P	13	
Zeillern	Parish church	2003		II/P	21	The organ, originally built by Johann Lachmayr in 1906 and rebuilt by Paul Heer in 1961, was replaced in 2003 by a new instrument built into the original case. The new organ of the parish church of Zeillern, built by Orgelbau Pieringer from Haag, was inaugurated on 14 February 2004 by prelate Dr. Walter Graf.
Hallwang	Parish church	2005		II/P	19	
Matzleinsdorf	Parish church	2006		II/P	12	
Sankt Marien	Parish church	2008		II/P	15	
Liefering	Parish church of the Apostles Peter and Paul	2009		II/P	15	
Scheibbs	St. Barbara Monastery Church	2010		III/P	17	
Ybbs an der Donau	Parish church of St. Lawrence	2012		III/P	30	The baroque organ was made by Bartholomäus Heintzer in 1723 after the town fire in 1716. From 2009 to 2012 the organ was de facto rebuilt by Orgelbau Pieringer in the existing housing.
Wolfern	Parish church	2014		II/P	20	

== Awards and honors ==
- 2007 – Ausbilder-Trophy 2007, 3rd prize for the training of apprentices in the fields of business and entrepreneurship.
- 2007 – nomination for the Austrian Adolf Loos Prize for the »Klangwürfel« organ project.
- 2014 – Austrian Maecenas Prize in the category Best Cultural Sponsorship of Small and Medium-Sized Enterprises for the financing of the concert series "Orgelkunst 2013" at Ybbs an der Donau.
