= Ybbs Valley Railway =

Coordinates: 47.9682°N 14.7660°E

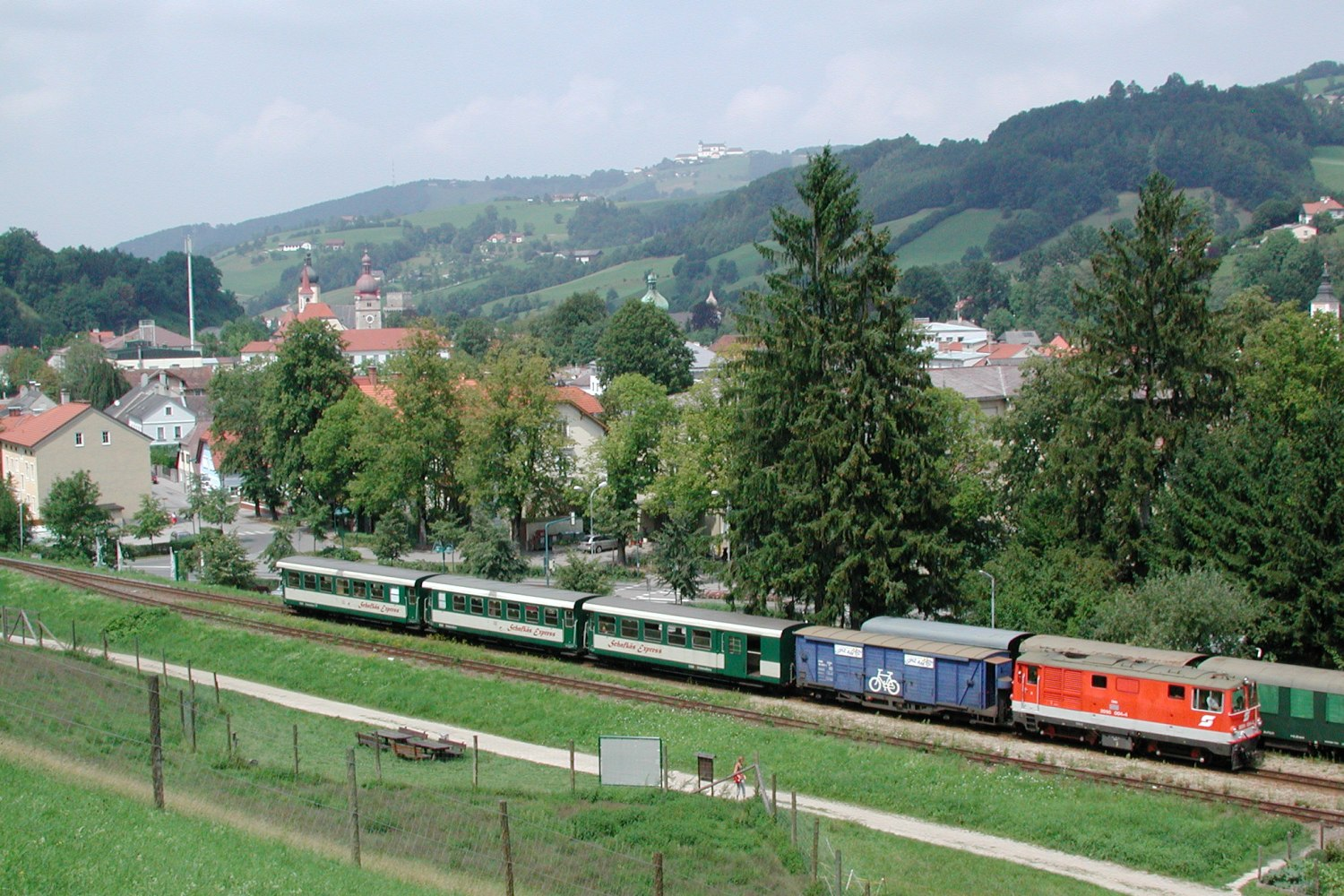
Train at Waidhofen an der Ybbs Lokalbahn station

The Ybbs Valley Railway (German: Ybbstalbahn) was a narrow-gauge railway of the Austrian Federal Railways with a track gauge of 760 mm (2 ft 5 15/16 in), located in the Lower Austrian Mostviertel.

The original route followed the valley of the river Ybbs from Waidhofen an der Ybbs to Kienberg-Gaming, with a branchline to the town of Ybbsitz. A small, 3.2 kilometer long, section between the railway station of Waidhofen an der Ybbs and the Pestalozistraße still operates as Waidhofen City Railway (German: Citybahn Waidhofen), while the route from Lunz am See to Kienberg-Gaming is currently operated as a heritage railway under the name Ybbsthalbahn-Bergstrecke (mountain line). Plans are under way to extend the heritage section to the town of Göstling, where tracks of the old railway are still in place.

== Route ==
=== Waidhofen an der Ybbs - Lunz am See ===
The Ybbs Valley Railway starts from the narrow-gauge railway platform opposite the main standard gauge station at Waidhofen am der Ybbs, where the workshops are located. Until the end of freight service transhipment from normal to narrow gauge was done in this station. The railway first serves several halts in the city of Waidhofen, crossing a spectacular viaduct over the town, until it comes to the station at the Pestalozistraße at the 3 Kilometer mark which is the end of the line since 12 December 2020.

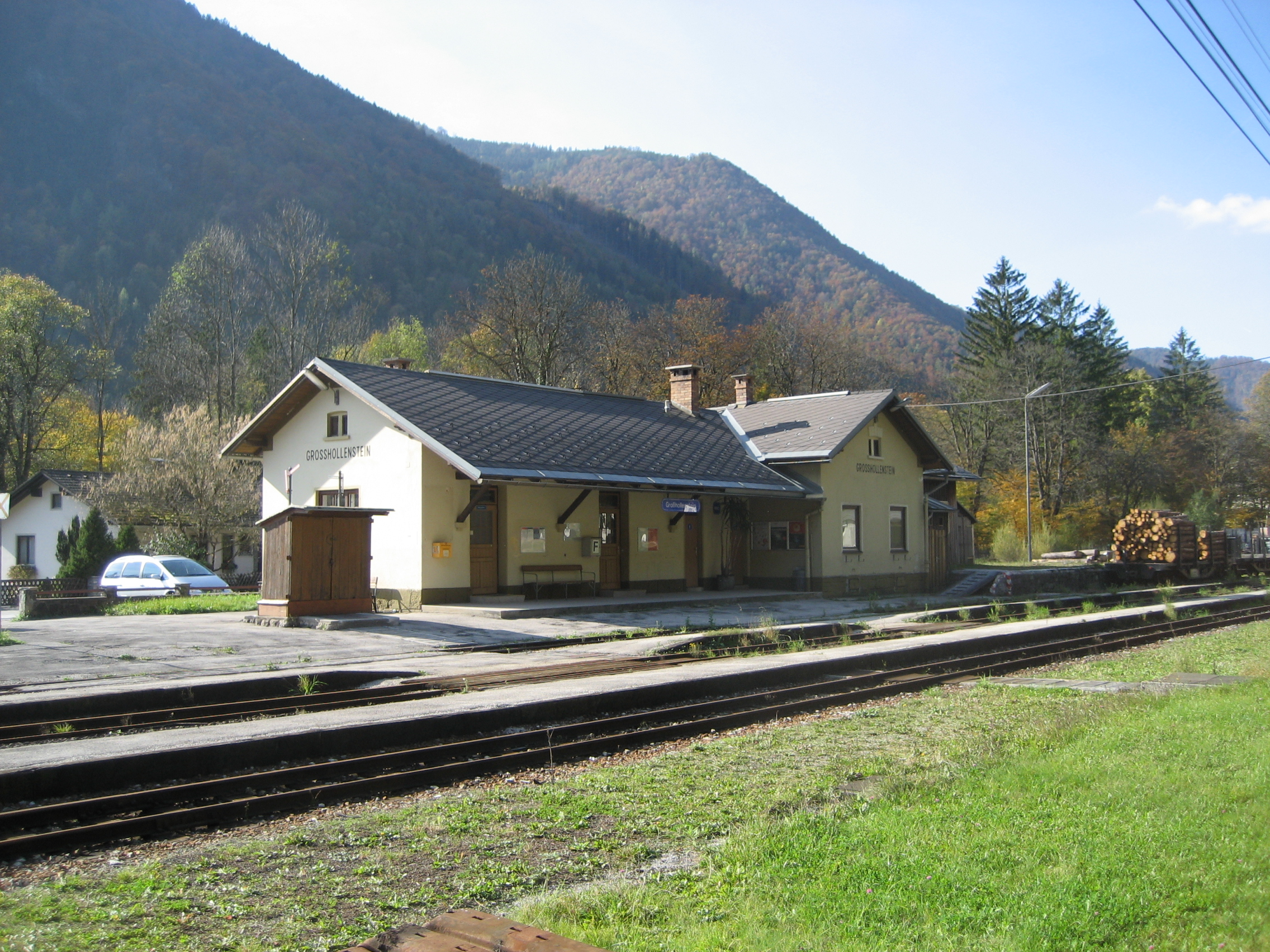
Großhollenstein

The main route closed since December 2010 then followed the river Ybbs, which it crossed three times. The next large station was Opponitz, the location of the only tunnel of the Ybbs Valley Railway, and then after 25 km Hollenstein an der Ybbs (station Großhollenstein). This section from here gained altitude, as it followed the valley of the upper Ybbs.

This section served mainly smaller stops, which were used mainly by hikers during the summer, only Sankt Georgen am Reith providing much local passenger traffic. At kilometre 44 is the tourist town of Göstling in the Scheibbs district. From July 2012 the line beyond this point to Lunz am See was due to re-open as a heritage railway, joining the existing operation from Lunz over the Pfaffenschlag pass to Kienberg-Gaming. However, the re-opening of this extension has been delayed. The Lunz - Keinberg Gaming section was closed in May 1988 and has operated since 1990 as a heritage railway.

At Kienberg-Gaming it connected to the standard gauge Erlauf Valley Railway, now closed as far as the district capital, Scheibbs. A 700 mm (2 ft 3 9/16 in) gauge forestry railway up the valley of the Ois river terminated at Lunz am See station until it closed in the 1970s.

=== Gstadt - Ybbsitz ===
Gstadt station used to be the junction for the branch line until December 2010, this line branching off the main route and crossing the Ybbs on a steel girder bridge. The line, which followed the valley of the Kleine Ybbs (Little Ybbs), served several small stops and ended after six kilometers in the market town of Ybbsitz. The line crossed several level crossings, resulting in conflict with automobile traffic. Track removal on this line started in July 2013.

=== Gaming - Lunz am See (preserved railway) ===
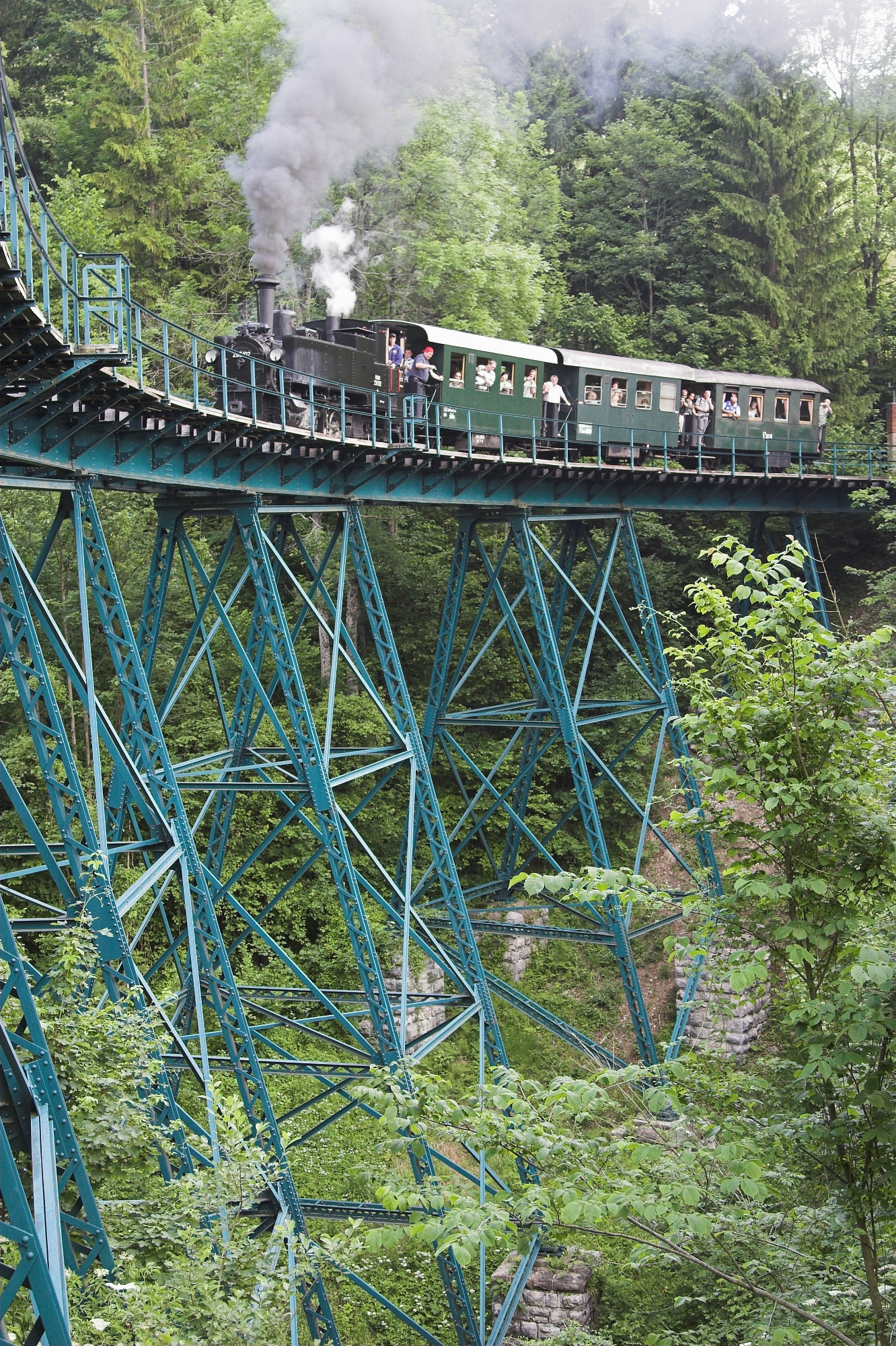

The starting point of the museum railway today is the station at Kienberg-Gaming, the original terminal of the Ybbs Valley Railway and formerly the last stop of the standard gauge Erlauf Valley Railway of the ÖBB. This line is now closed beyond Scheibbs. At Kienberg-Gaming are the railway's facilities: the locomotive shed with workshop, which has been increased in size by the ÖGLB, a turntable, and a newly built carriage shed.

Shortly after leaving Kienberg-Gaming station the railway crosses a main road, and a little later, on a steel framework bridge, the Pockaubach and the road to Gresten. The alignment follows a steep wooded mountain saddle-back up to the summit of the Pfaffenschlag, at which first the stop, Gaming, is reached. The scenery opens up here to offer a beautiful panorama view over the region and the Kartause Gaming, after which the railway enters a steep rocky section in dense forest, and runs through many deep cuttings. In this section are the two landmarks of the "mountain line", two steel trestle viaducts, a bridge type otherwise only used in Austria on the Stubaitalbahn. The maximum grade on this section of the Ybbs Valley Railway is 3.44% (1:29), which is the steepest gradient of any Austrian narrow-gauge railway with a track gauge of 760 mm (2 ft 5 15/16 in).

The highest point the railway, 699 m, is reached at Pfaffenschlag, which also highest point of the parallel pass road. At this station the steam engines replenish their water supply, then the railway follows the valley of the Bodingbach. The tracks run through several deep rock cuttings, and in particularly steep area solid retaining walls are used. The railway soon reaches the first houses of the summer-resort Lunz am See and runs through a forest of wood-apples. The railway then runs partially close area between the roofs of houses and a cliff. After crossing the Bodingbach the railway reaches the station of Lunz am See, which it used in conjunction with the section of the Ybbs Valley Railway formerly run by the ÖBB but now closed as far as Gstadt, though the track is still intact.

== History ==
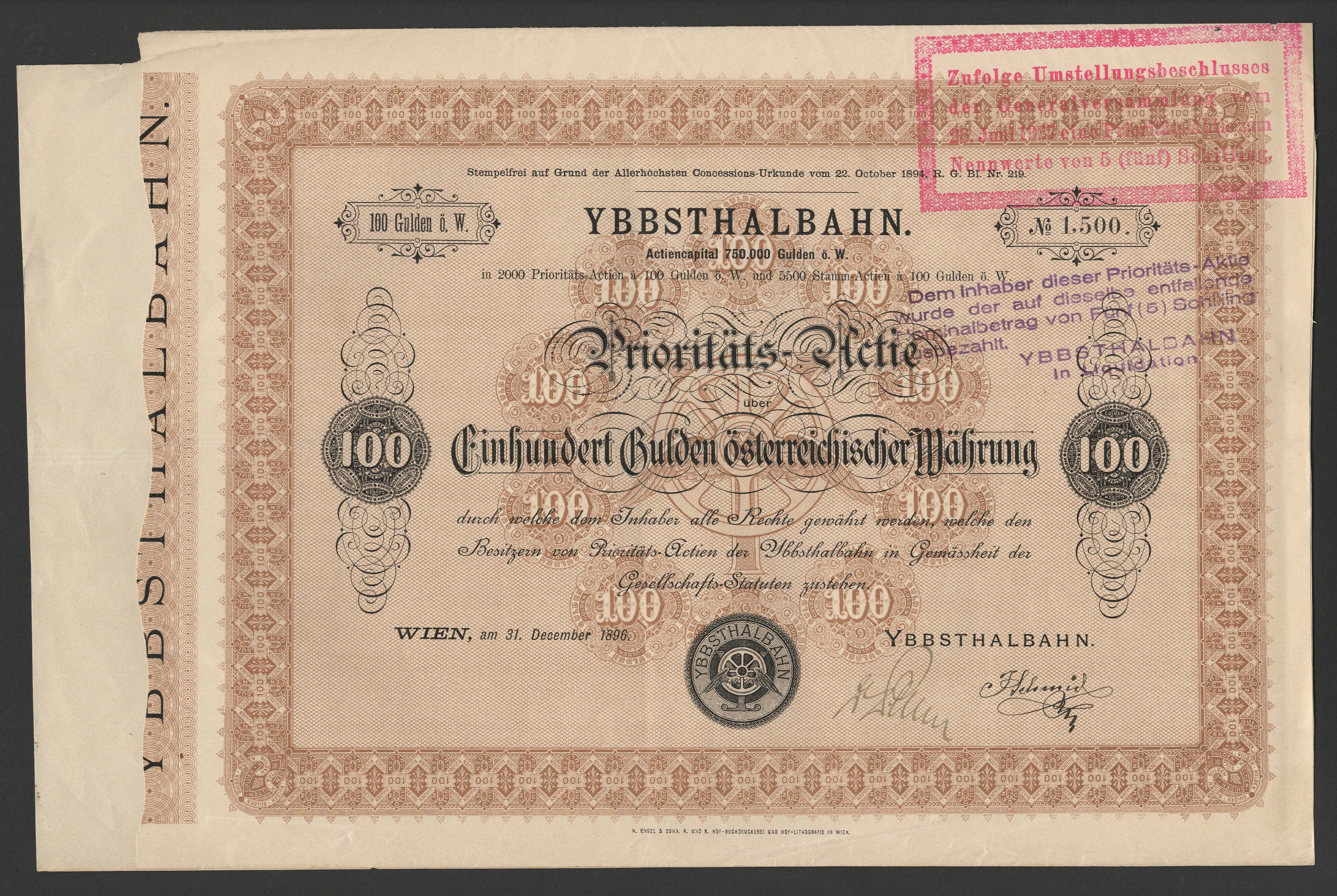
Share of the Ybbs Valley Railway, issued 31 December 1896

There were plans in 1870 to build a railway up the valley of the Ybbs to Kienberg-Gaming. The collapse of the stock market of Vienna in 1873 brought a sudden end to this project. In the 1880s representatives of the Ybbstal again looked at building a secondary line, however only in 1893 did negotiations with the government Ministries begin. On 26 December of the same year a law was passed for the building of the Ybbs Valley Railway. Consequently, a decree of the Ministry of the Interior was given on 11 September 1895 for the establishment of a corporation with the capital investment of 1,612,000 guldens.

The turning of the first sod for the initial section from Waidhofen to Gross Hollenstein took place at Waidhofen on 1 June 1895. The opening of this section took place on 15 July 1896. Three years later, on 15 May 1898, the second section from Gross Hollenstein to Lunz am See was opened. The section from Lunz am See - the so-called "Bergstrecke" - to Kienberg-Gaming, the most difficult section to construct, was opened later that year, on 12 November. Thus the entire 71 km route was constructed over a period of only 3 years.

With the building of the railway, the practice of rafting timber down the river ceased as it was unable to compete. The iron and steel processing industry was however tied up better with the ore mines on the Erzberg mountain and this industry prospered.

In 2010 the administration of Lower Austria shutdown the railwayline from Gstadt to Ybbsitz and Lunz am See. Today trains run only 5,5 km from the mainstation Waidhofen an der Ybbs (ÖBB) to Gstadt, called "City-railway" .

== Closure of the mountain line and re-opening as a museum railway ==
The heavily graded section of the Ybbs Valley Railwayknown as the "Bergstrecke", with a length of 17.5 kilometers, connected the upper Ybbstal around Lunz am See and Göstling an der Ybbs with the Erlauftal, where it connected to the standard gauge line to the town of Scheibbs. The drift of passengers to buses and private cars on the faster road connection over the Grubberg pass road, as well as the transit of almost all goods traffic through Waidhofen led to a continuous decline in income. These developments led finally in May 1988 to the closure of this section of the railway.

The Austrian Society for Local Railways (ÖGLB) already successfully operated the Höllental Railway as a museum railway at this time, the operating company being the NÖLB (Niederösterreich local railways). The NÖLB leased this section from ÖBB and commenced operation as a museum railway in 1990 under the name "Ötscherland Express". Later the railway was renamed the "Ybbsthalbahn-Bergstrecke" (Ybbs Valley Railway mountain line).

== Economic importance ==
The economic importance of the Ybbs Valley Railway was particularly great from its completion in 1898 to about 1960. Today important companies such as Welser or the Böhler Uddeholm company have their parent plants in Ybbsitz and Böhlerwerk and were over many years the major employers in this region. By working with these industries and their meeting their need for efficient transport the railway also became an important employer.
