= Windpassing =

Windpassing may refer to several locations:

- Windpassing (Büchlberg), Büchlberg municipality, Passau district, Bavaria, Germany
- Windpassing (Hauzenberg), Hauzenberg municipality, Passau district, Bavaria, Germany
- Windpassing (Ennsdorf), Ennsdorf municipality, Amstetten district, Lower Austria
- Windpassing (Grabern), Grabern municipality, Hollabrunn district, Lower Austria
- Windpassing (Neustadtl), Neustadtl an der Donau municipality, Amstetten district, Lower Austria
- Windpassing (St. Pölten), Harland subdistrict, St. Pölten district, Lower Austria
- Windpassing (Steinakirchen), Steinakirchen am Forst municipality, Scheibbs district, Lower Austria
- Windpassing (Altenberg), Altenberg bei Linz municipality, Urfahr-Umgebung district, Upper Austria
