= Biberbach, Austria =

Biberbach
- Municipality
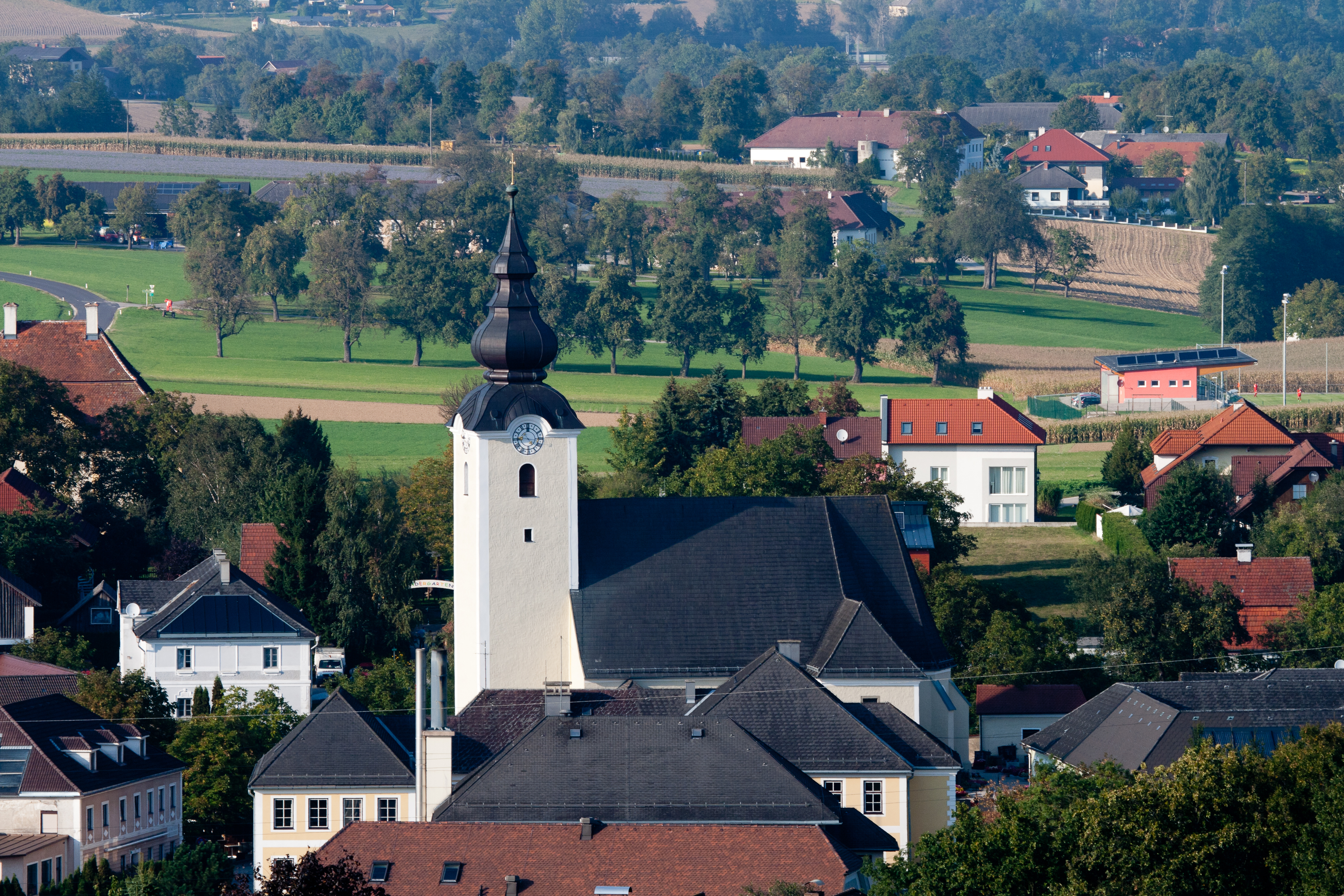

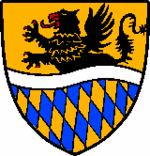
- Coat of arms

- Location within Austria
- Coordinates: 48°1′N 14°41′E
- Country: Austria
- State: Lower Austria
- District: Amstetten

Government
  - Mayor: Friedrich Hinterleitner

Area
  - Total: 28.42 km^{2} (10.97 sq mi)
- Elevation: 355 m (1,165 ft)

Population (2018-01-01)
  - Total: 2,270
  - Density: 79.9/km^{2} (207/sq mi)
- Time zone: UTC+1 (CET)
  - Summer (DST): UTC+2 (CEST)
- Postal code: 3353
- Area code: 07476
- Website: www.biberbach.gv.at

Biberbach (German pronunciation: [ˈbiːbɐbax]) is a village in the district of Amstetten in Lower Austria in Austria.

== Geography ==
Biberbach lies in the Mostviertel in Lower Austria in the hills between the Ybbs River and the Url River.
