= Bubendorf (disambiguation) =

Bubendorf may refer to:

- in Switzerland
  - Bubendorf, a municipality in the canton of Basel-Country
  - a former German name for Boncourt, Switzerland, in the canton of Jura
- in Germany
  - the place Bubendorf (Saxony) in the municipality of Frohburg, district Leipziger Land, Saxony
- in Austria
  - Bubendorf (Wolfsbach), in the municipality Wolfsbach, Lower Austria
  - Bubendorf (Pilgersdorf), in the municipality Pilgersdorf, Burgenland
