= Ferschnitz =

- Municipality
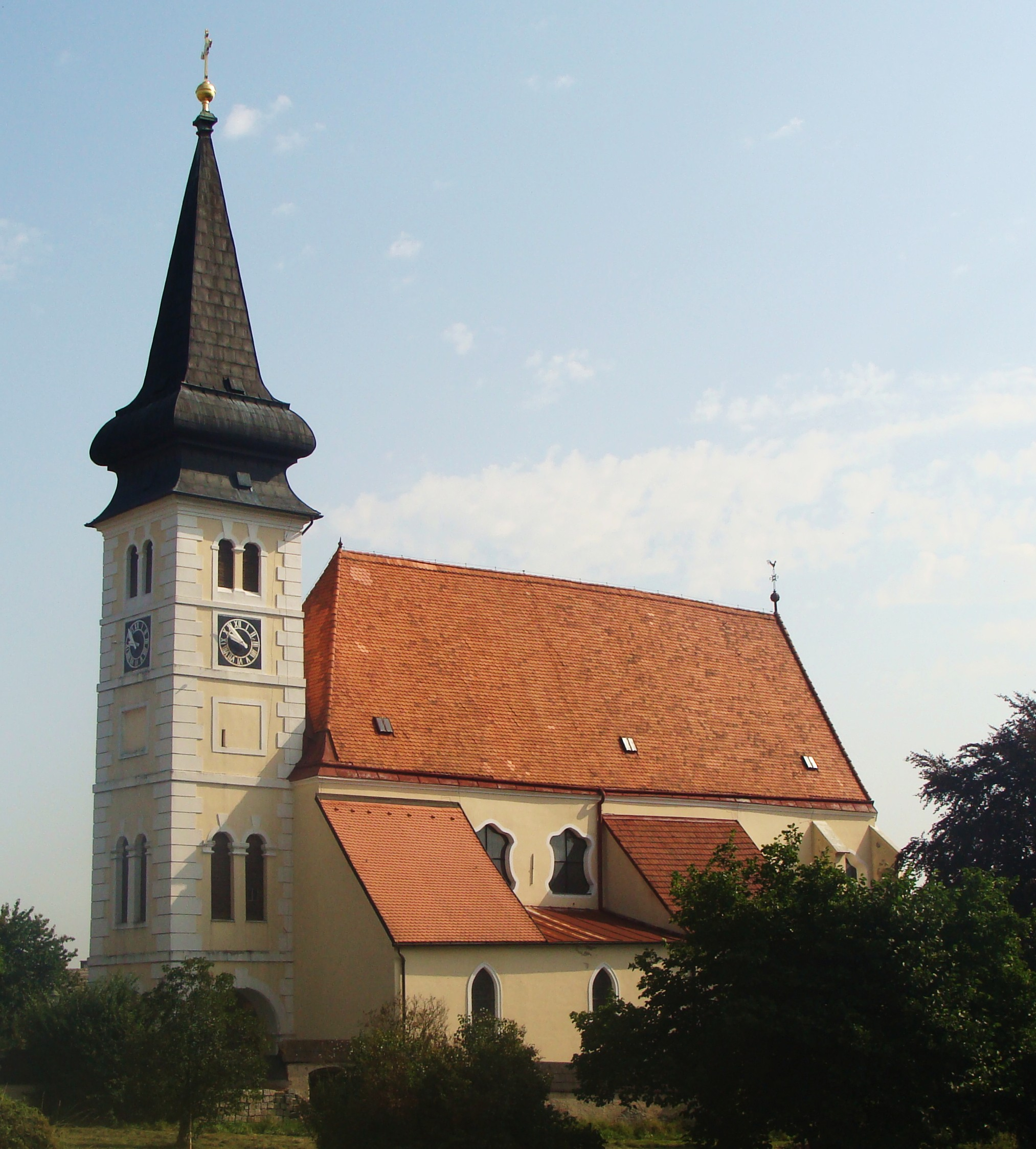
- Catholic church in Ferschnitz

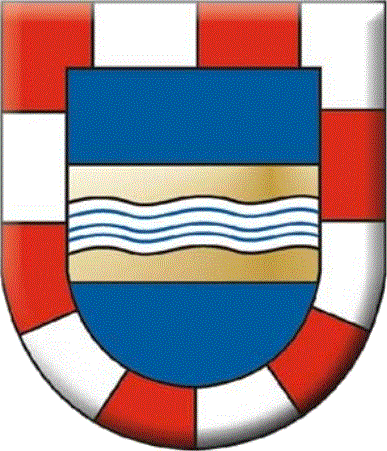
- Coat of arms

- Location within Austria
- Coordinates: 48°5′N 15°0′E
- Country: Austria
- State: Lower Austria
- District: Amstetten

Government
  - Mayor: Johann Berger

Area
  - Total: 15.55 km^{2} (6.00 sq mi)
- Elevation: 276 m (906 ft)

Population (2018-01-01)
  - Total: 1,770
  - Density: 114/km^{2} (295/sq mi)
- Time zone: UTC+1 (CET)
  - Summer (DST): UTC+2 (CEST)
- Postal code: 3325
- Area code: 07473
- Website: www.ferschnitz.gv.at

Ferschnitz is a town in the district of Amstetten in Lower Austria in Austria.

== Population ==
Historical population
Year	Pop.	±%
1979	1,207	—
1981	1,234	+2.2%
1991	1,406	+13.9%
2001	1,601	+13.9%
