= Ertl, Lower Austria =

Ertl
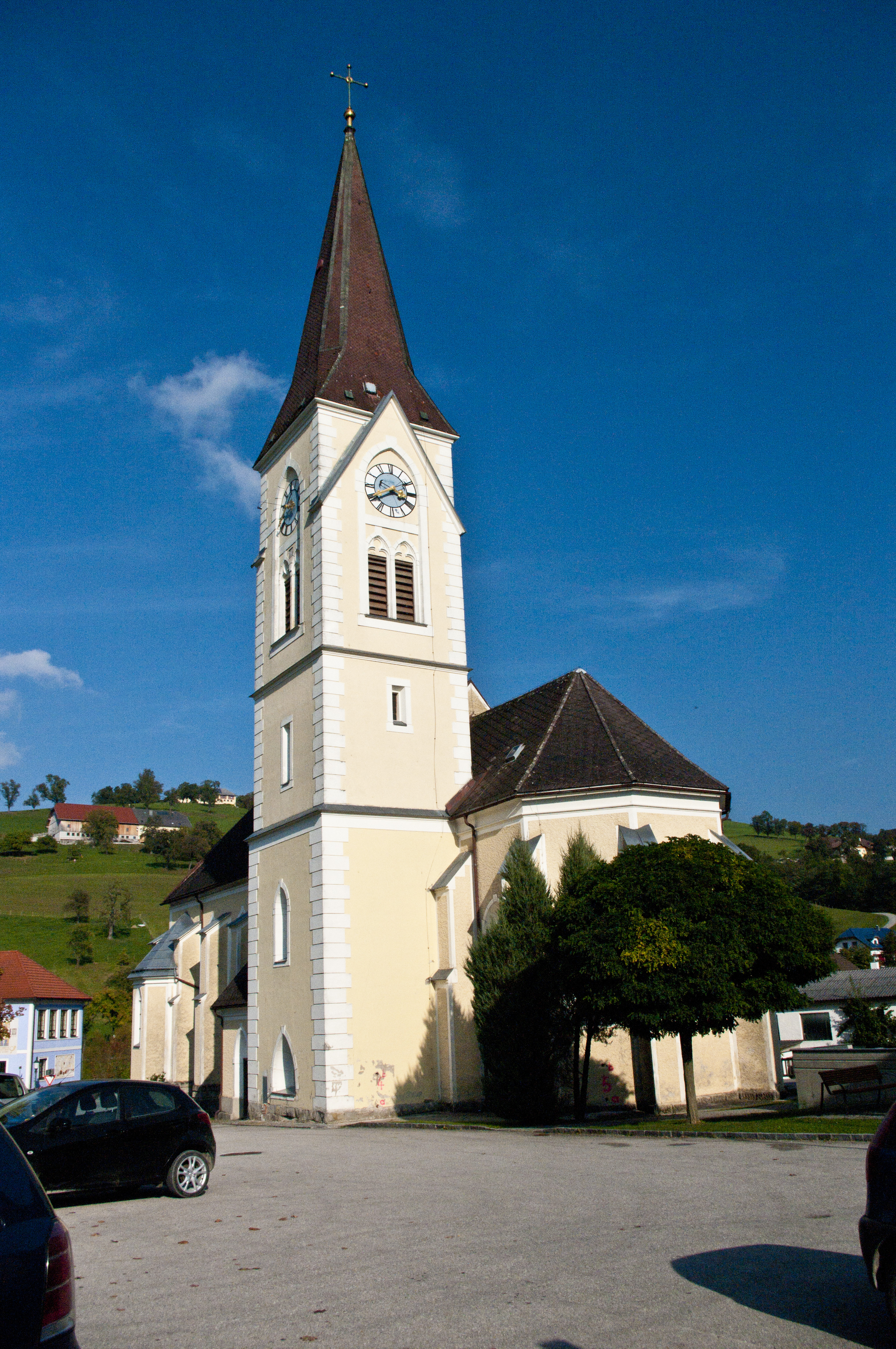
- Catholic church in Ertl

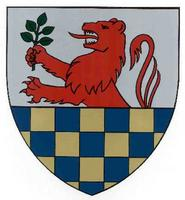
- Coat of arms

- Location within Austria
- Coordinates: 47°59′N 14°38′E
- Country: Austria
- State: Lower Austria
- District: Amstetten

Government
  - Mayor: Alois Panstingl-Panstingl

Area
  - Total: 21.13 km^{2} (8.16 sq mi)
- Elevation: 440 m (1,440 ft)

Population (2018-01-01)
  - Total: 1,252
  - Density: 59.25/km^{2} (153.5/sq mi)
- Time zone: UTC+1 (CET)
  - Summer (DST): UTC+2 (CEST)
- Postal code: 3355
- Area code: 07477
- Website: www.ertl.gv.at

Ertl is a town in the district of Amstetten in Lower Austria.

== History ==
In ancient times, the area that is now Ertl was part of the province of Noricum.

The territory was inhabited in the Middle Neolithic period (c. 2500 BC), as evidenced by the discovery of some stone axes, tools, and other artifacts of the period.

The present town was formed in 1922, from portions of the parishes of St. Peter, and Waidhofen. Ertl became an independent parish in 1930.
