= Viehdorf =

- Municipality
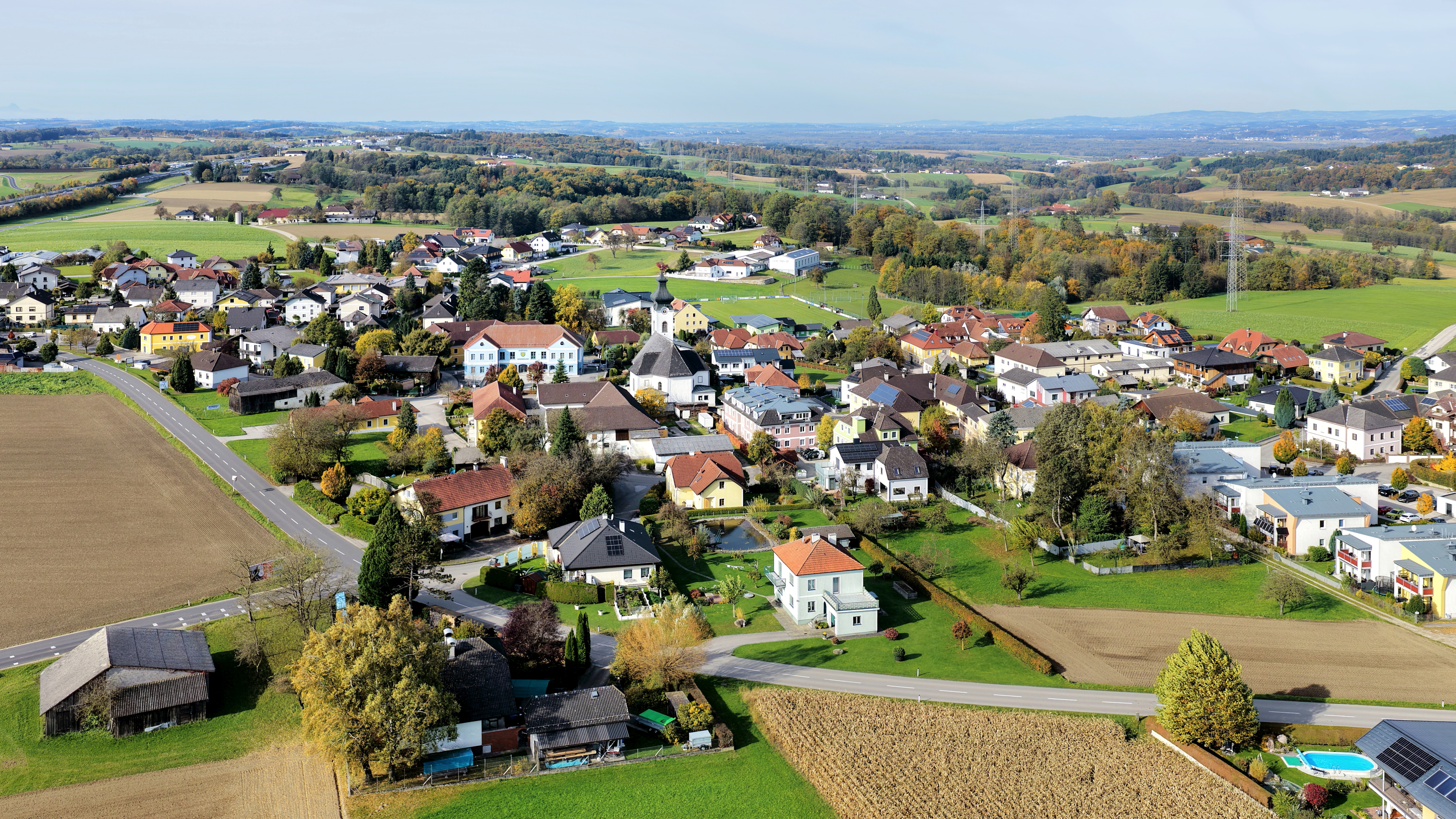
- East view of Viehdorf

- Coat of arms

- Location within Austria
- Coordinates: 48°7′N 14°55′E
- Country: Austria
- State: Lower Austria
- District: Amstetten

Government
  - Mayor: Johann Redl

Area
  - Total: 15.85 km^{2} (6.12 sq mi)
- Elevation: 359 m (1,178 ft)

Population (2018-01-01)
  - Total: 1,372
  - Density: 86.56/km^{2} (224.2/sq mi)
- Time zone: UTC+1 (CET)
  - Summer (DST): UTC+2 (CEST)
- Postal code: 3322
- Area code: 07472
- Website: www.viehdorf.gv.at

Viehdorf is a town in the district of Amstetten in Lower Austria in Austria.
