= Behamberg =

- Municipality
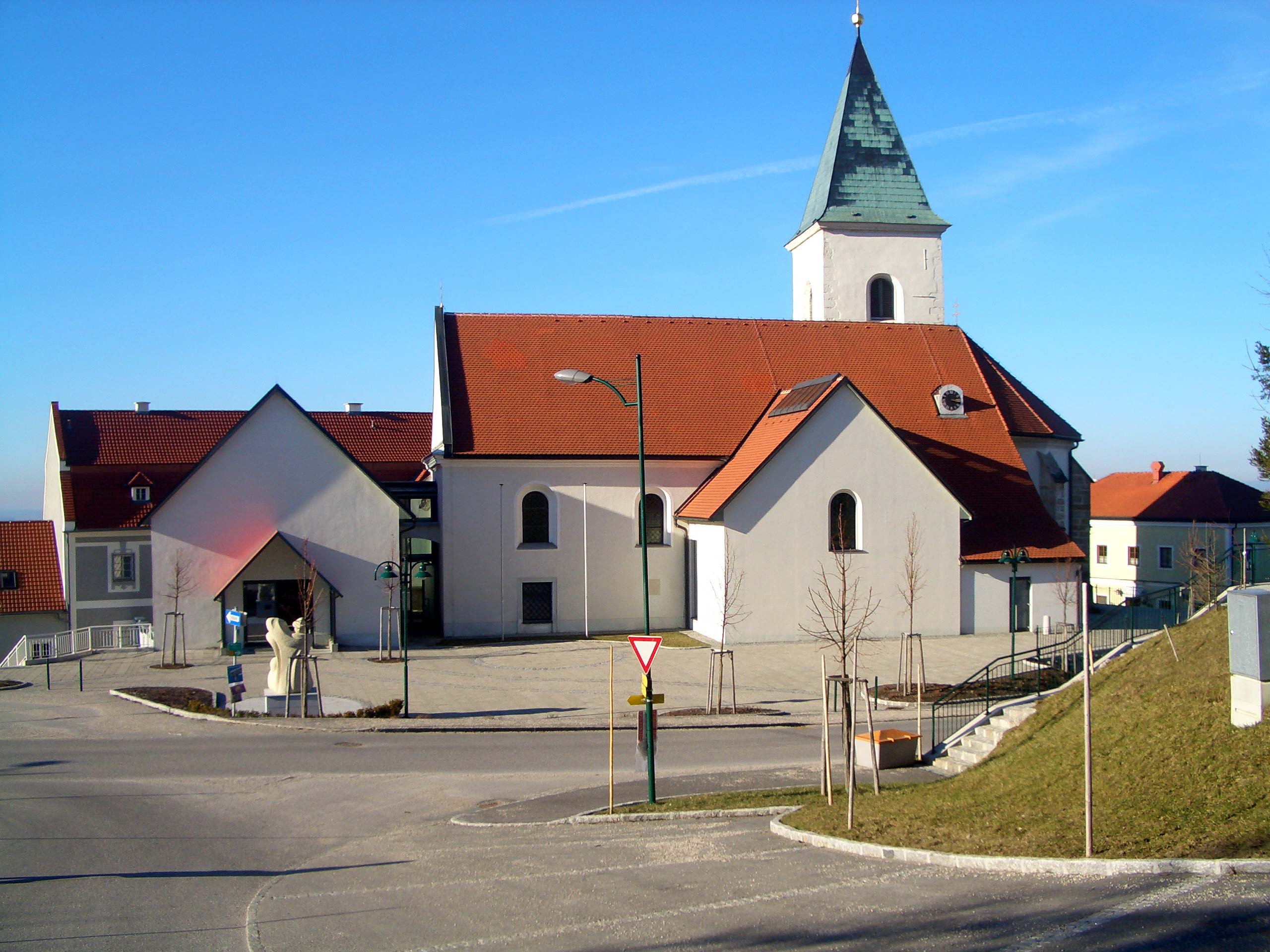
- Catholic parish church

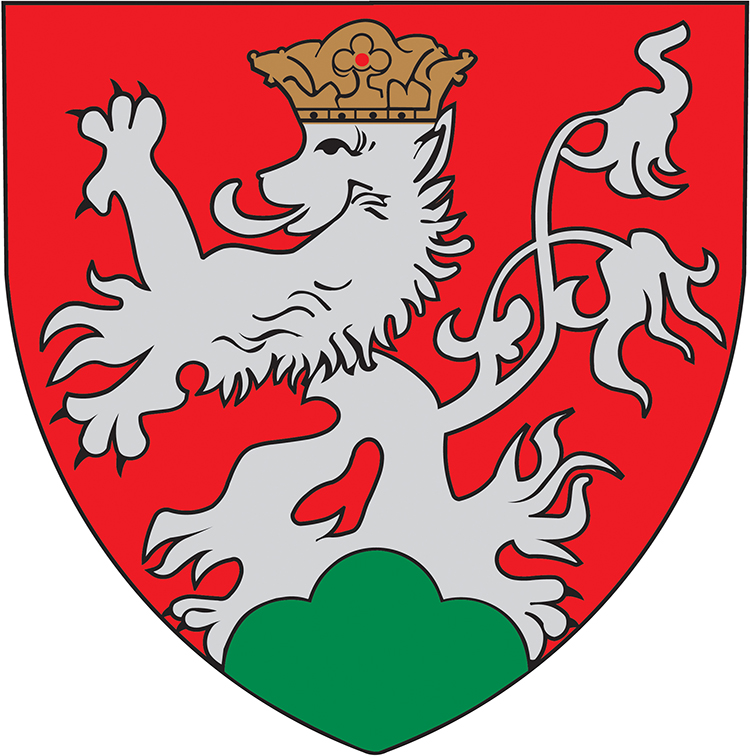
- Coat of arms

- Location within Austria
- Coordinates: 48°1′N 14°28′E
- Country: Austria
- State: Lower Austria
- District: Amstetten

Government
  - Mayor: Karl Josef Stegh (ÖVP)

Area
  - Total: 20.26 km^{2} (7.82 sq mi)
- Elevation: 524 m (1,719 ft)

Population (2018-01-01)
  - Total: 3,387
  - Density: 167.2/km^{2} (433.0/sq mi)
- Time zone: UTC+1 (CET)
  - Summer (DST): UTC+2 (CEST)
- Postal code: 4441
- Area code: +43 7252
- Website: www.behamberg.gv.at

Behamberg is a town in the district of Amstetten in Lower Austria in Austria.

== Geography ==
Behamberg lies in the Mostviertel in Lower Austria.
