= Ernsthofen =

- Municipality
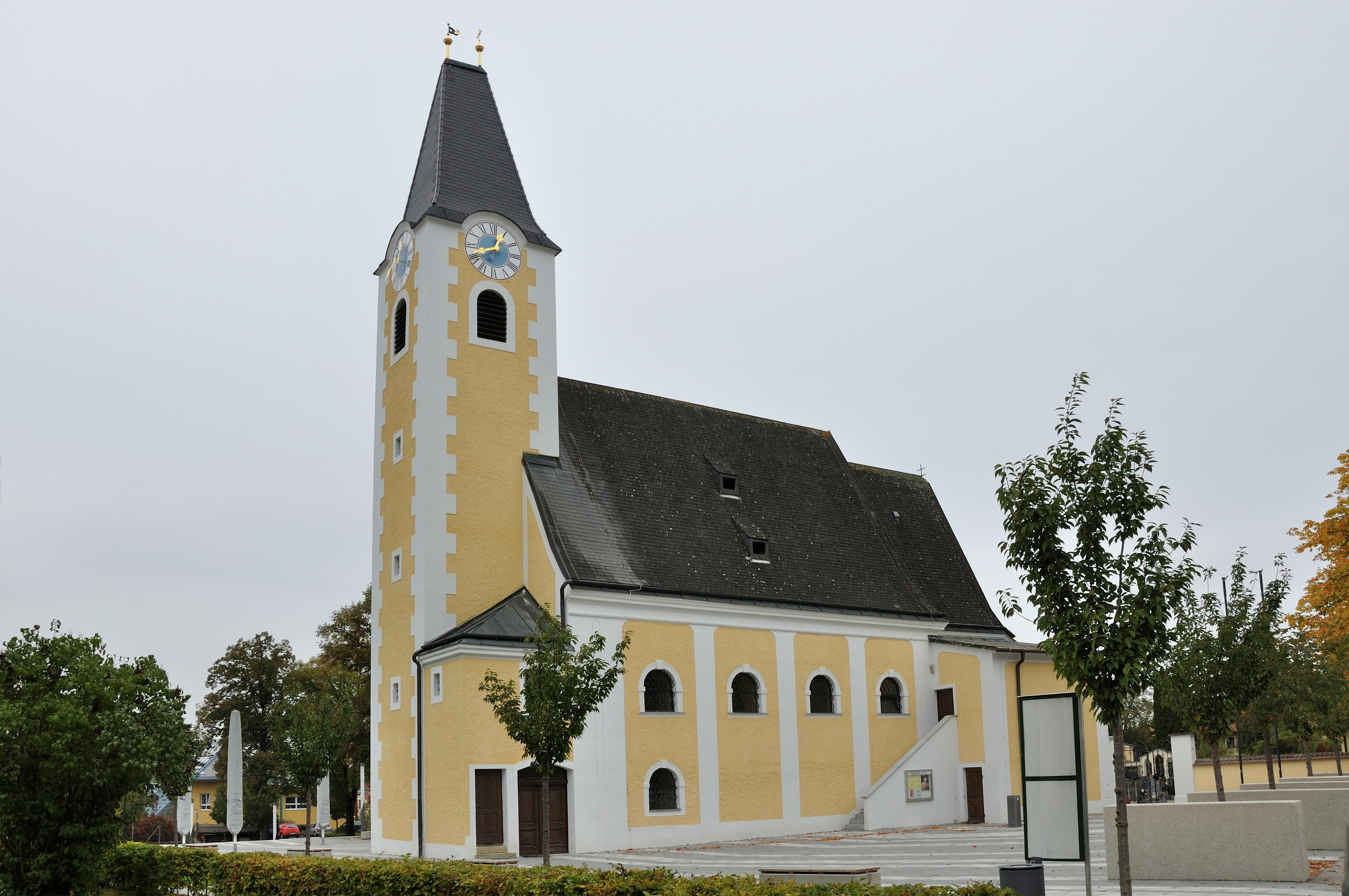
- Catholic church in Ernsthofen

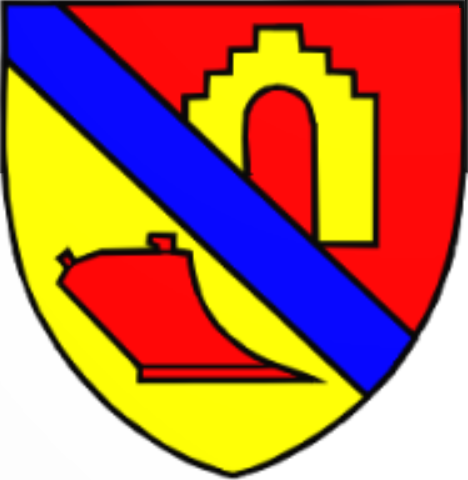
- Coat of arms

- Location within Austria
- Coordinates: 48°8′N 14°29′E
- Country: Austria
- State: Lower Austria
- District: Amstetten

Government
  - Mayor: Karl Huber

Area
  - Total: 17.79 km^{2} (6.87 sq mi)
- Elevation: 264 m (866 ft)

Population (2018-01-01)
  - Total: 2,230
  - Density: 125/km^{2} (325/sq mi)
- Time zone: UTC+1 (CET)
  - Summer (DST): UTC+2 (CEST)
- Postal code: 4432
- Area code: 07435
- Website: www.ernsthofen.at

Ernsthofen is a town in the district of Amstetten in Lower Austria in Austria.

== Population ==
Historical population
Year	Pop.	±%
1869	1,075	—
1880	1,100	+2.3%
1890	1,120	+1.8%
1900	1,202	+7.3%
1910	1,177	−2.1%
1923	1,238	+5.2%
1934	1,262	+1.9%
1939	1,279	+1.3%
1951	1,316	+2.9%
1961	1,504	+14.3%
1971	1,745	+16.0%
1981	1,825	+4.6%
1991	2,004	+9.8%
2001	2,105	+5.0%
2005	2,177	+3.4%
