= Amstetten District =

Coordinates: 48.1167°N 14.8667°E

Amstetten District Bezirk Amstetten
- District
- Country: Austria
- State: Lower Austria
- Number of municipalities: 33
- Administrative seat: Amstetten

Government
  - District Governor: Martina Gerersdorfer

Area
  - Total: 1,188.0 km^{2} (458.7 sq mi)

Population (2016-01-01)
  - Total: 114,621
  - Density: 96.482/km^{2} (249.89/sq mi)
- Time zone: UTC+01:00 (CET)
  - Summer (DST): UTC+02:00 (CEST)
- Vehicle registration: AM
- NUTS code: AT121

Bezirk Amstetten is a district of the state of Lower Austria in Austria.

== Municipalities ==
Towns (Städte) are indicated in boldface; market towns (Marktgemeinden) in italics; suburbs, hamlets and other subdivisions of a municipality are indicated in small characters.

- Allhartsberg
  - Angerholz, Kröllendorf, Kühberg, Maierhofen, Wallmersdorf
- Amstetten
  - Edla, Greinsfurth, Hausmening, Mauer bei Amstetten, Neufurth, Preinsbach, Schönbichl, Ulmerfeld
- Ardagger
  - Ardagger Markt, Ardagger Stift, Kollmitzberg, Stephanshart
- Aschbach-Markt
  - Abetzberg, Aschbach-Dorf, Krenstetten, Mitterhausleiten, Oberaschbach
- Behamberg
  - Badhof, Penz, Ramingdorf, Wanzenöd
- Biberbach
- Ennsdorf
- Ernsthofen
  - Aigenfließen, Rubring
- Ertl
- Euratsfeld
  - Aigen, Gafring
- Ferschnitz
  - Innerochsenbach
- Haag
  - Edelhof, Gstetten, Heimberg, Holzleiten, Knillhof, Krottendorf, Porstenberg, Radhof, Reichhub, Salaberg, Schudutz
- Haidershofen
  - Brunnhof, Dorf an der Enns, Sträußl, Tröstlberg, Vestenthal
- Hollenstein an der Ybbs
  - Berg, Dornleiten, Garnberg, Grießau, Hohenlehen, Krengraben, Oberkirchen, Oisberg, Sattel, Thalbauer, Thomasberg, Walcherbauer, Wenten
- Kematen an der Ybbs
- Neuhofen an der Ybbs
  - Amesleithen, Kornberg, Neuhofen an der Ybbs, Perbersdorf, Scherbling, Schindau, Toberstetten
- Neustadtl an der Donau
  - Berghof, Freyenstein, Hößgang, Kleinwolfstein, Nabegg, Neustadtl-Markt, Neustadtl-Umgebung, Schaltberg, Windpassing
- Oed-Öhling
  - Oed, Öhling
- Opponitz
  - Graben, Gstadt, Hauslehen, Ofenberg, Schwarzenbach, Strubb, Thann
- Seitenstetten
  - Seitenstetten Dorf, Seitenstetten Markt
- Sonntagberg
  - Baichberg, Böhlerwerk, Bruckbach, Gleiß, Hilm, Rosenau am Sonntagberg, Rotte Wühr, Sonntagberg
- Sankt Georgen am Reith
  - Hochau, Kogelsbach, Königsbergau, St. Georgen am Reith
- Sankt Georgen am Ybbsfelde
  - Hart, Hermannsdorf, Krahof, Leutzmannsdorf, Matzendorf, St. Georgen am Ybbsfelde
- Sankt Pantaleon-Erla
  - Erla, St. Pantaleon
- Sankt Peter in der Au
  - Hohenreith, Kürnberg, St. Johann in Engstetten, St. Michael am Bruckbach, St. Peter in der Au-Dorf, St. Peter in der Au-Markt
- Sankt Valentin
  - Altenhofen, Endholz, Hofkirchen, Rems, St. Valentin, Thurnsdorf
- Strengberg
  - Au, Limbach, Ottendorf, Ramsau, Strengberg, Thürnbuch
- Viehdorf
  - Hainstetten, Seisenegg, Viehdorf
- Wallsee-Sindelburg
  - Igelschwang, Ried, Schweinberg, Wallsee
- Weistrach
  - Grub, Hartlmühl, Holzschachen, Rohrbach, Schwaig, Weistrach
- Winklarn
  - Haag Dorf, Winklarn
- Wolfsbach
  - Bubendorf, Meilersdorf, Wolfsbach
- Ybbsitz
  - Großprolling, Haselgraben, Hubberg, Kleinprolling, Knieberg, Maisberg, Prochenberg, Schwarzenberg, Schwarzois, Ybbsitz, Zogelsgraben
- Zeillern
