= Haidershofen =

- Municipality
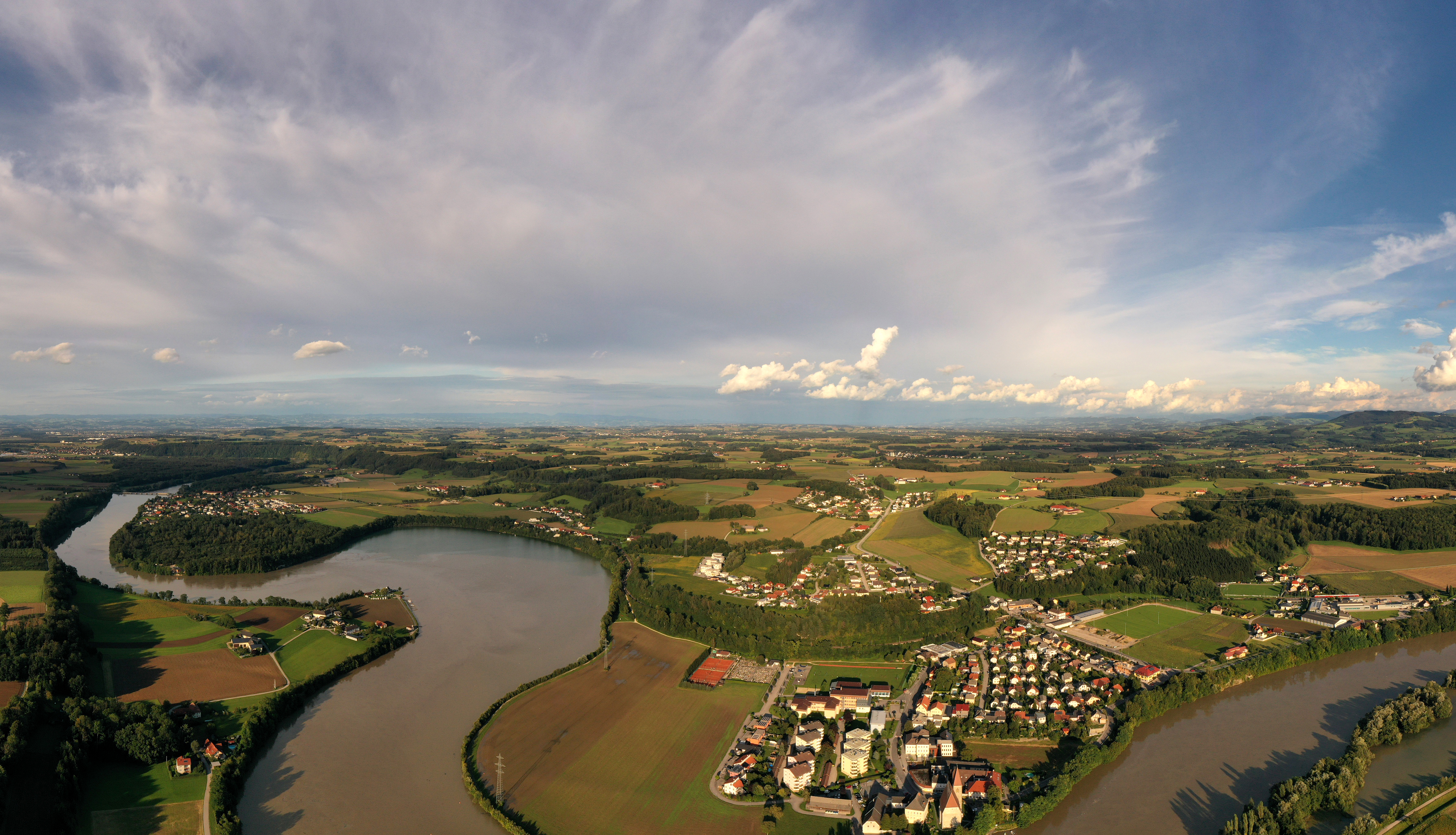
- View of Haidershofen

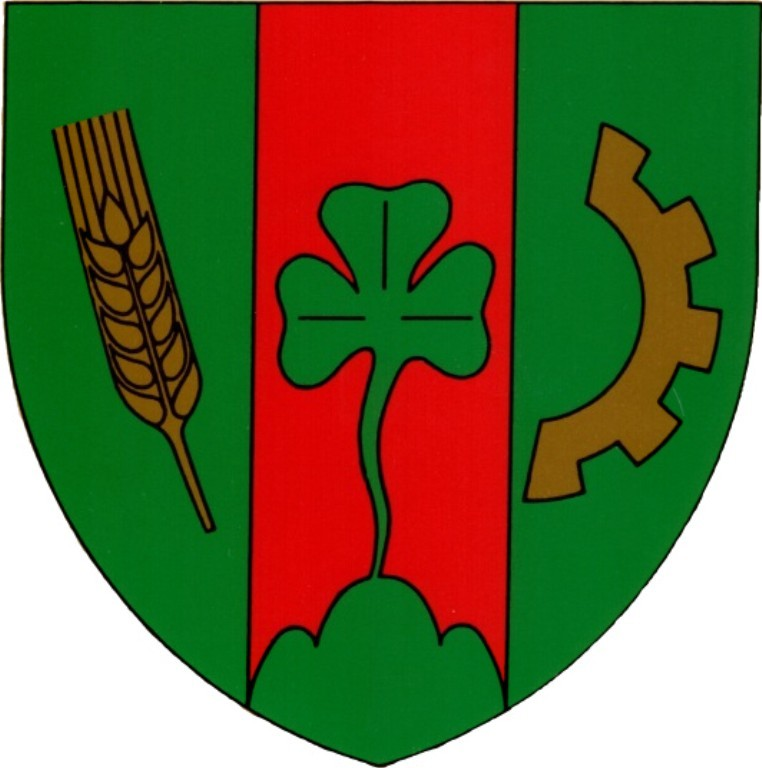
- Coat of arms

- Location within Austria
- Coordinates: 48°4′N 14°26′E
- Country: Austria
- State: Lower Austria
- District: Amstetten

Government
  - Mayor: Manfred Schimpl

Area
  - Total: 32.04 km^{2} (12.37 sq mi)
- Elevation: 285 m (935 ft)

Population (2018-01-01)
  - Total: 3,670
  - Density: 115/km^{2} (297/sq mi)
- Time zone: UTC+1 (CET)
  - Summer (DST): UTC+2 (CEST)
- Postal code: 4431
- Area code: 07434, 07252
- Website: www.haidershofen.gv.at

Haidershofen is a town located in Austria. The town is within the district of Amstetten, located in Lower Austria.

== Geography ==
Haidershofen lies in the Mostviertel in Lower Austria on the border of Upper Austria near Steyr. About 14 percent of the municipality is forested.
