= Sonntagberg =

- Municipality
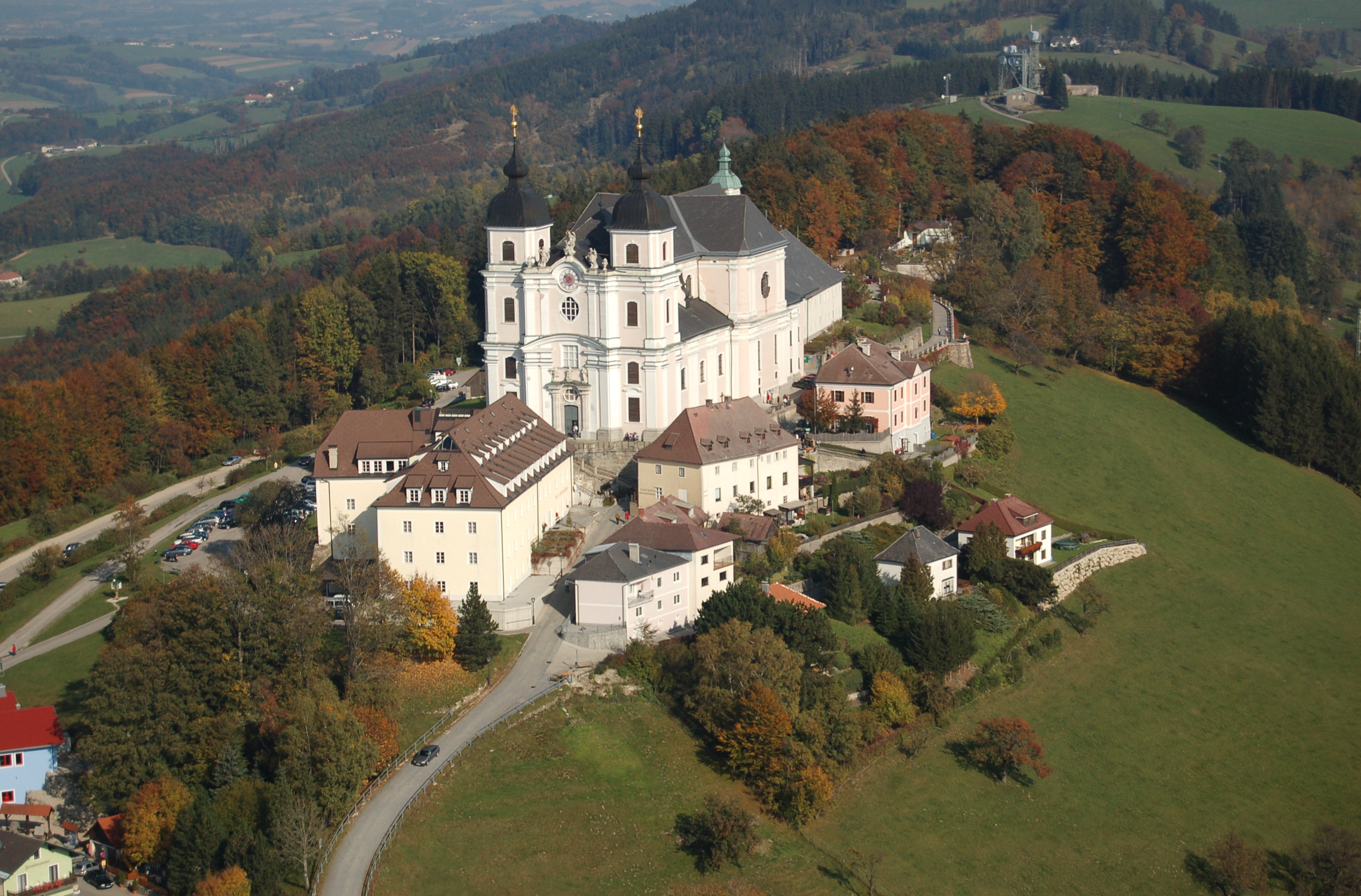
- Sonntagberg basilica church

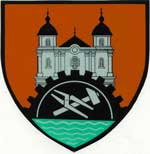
- Coat of arms

- Location within Austria
- Coordinates: 48°00′N 14°46′E
- Country: Austria
- State: Lower Austria
- District: Amstetten

Government
  - Mayor: Thomas Raidl

Area
  - Total: 18.42 km^{2} (7.11 sq mi)
- Elevation: 340 m (1,120 ft)

Population (2025-01-01)
  - Total: 3,661
  - Density: 198.8/km^{2} (514.8/sq mi)
- Time zone: UTC+1 (CET)
  - Summer (DST): UTC+2 (CEST)
- Postal code: 3333
- Area code: 07448
- Website: www.sonntagberg.gv.at

Sonntagberg is a town in the district of Amstetten in Lower Austria in Austria. It is an important pilgrimage location for Catholics. Its basilica church is often cited as one of the most beautiful buildings in the area.

== Geography ==
Sonntagberg lies in the Mostviertel in Lower Austria. About 29 percent of the municipality is forested.

== Landmarks ==
It has a baroque church that was, in its current form, built in 1706–1732 by Jakob Prandtauer and Joseph Munggenast. The ceilings were painted by Daniel Gran (1738–43). In 1964, Pope Paul VI gave it the title Basilica minor.

For a short while, Sonntagberg was the location of what would then become Summerhill School.
