= Ardagger =

- Municipality
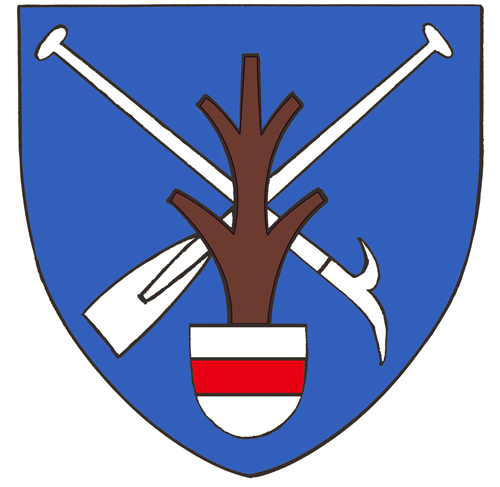
- Coat of arms

- Location within Austria
- Coordinates: 48°10′N 14°49′E
- Country: Austria
- State: Lower Austria
- District: Amstetten

Government
  - Mayor: Johannes Pressl

Area
  - Total: 47.16 km^{2} (18.21 sq mi)
- Elevation: 250 m (820 ft)

Population (2018-01-01)
  - Total: 3,511
  - Density: 74.45/km^{2} (192.8/sq mi)
- Time zone: UTC+1 (CET)
  - Summer (DST): UTC+2 (CEST)
- Postal code: 3321
- Area code: 07479
- Website: www.ardagger.gv.at

Ardagger is a town in the district of Amstetten in Lower Austria in Austria.

== Geography ==
Ardagger lies in southwest Lower Austria, between the Danube and the hills of the Mostviertel.

The municipality of Ardagger is divided into these cadastral communities (population as of January 1st, 2022):

- Ardagger Markt
- Ardagger Stift
- Stephanshart

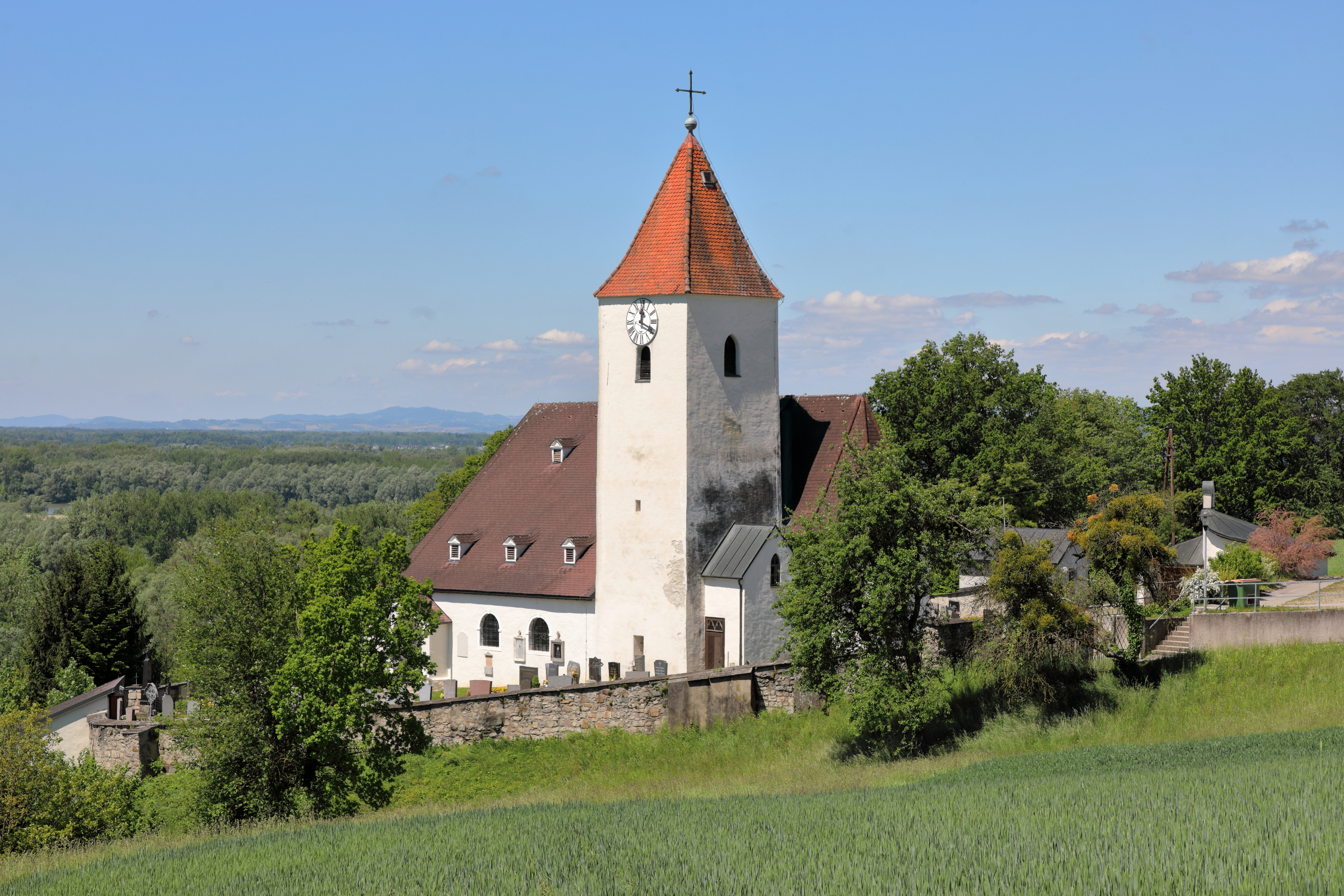
Parish church of Ardagger Markt
