= St. Georgen am Ybbsfelde =

Sankt Georgen am Ybbsfelde
- Municipality
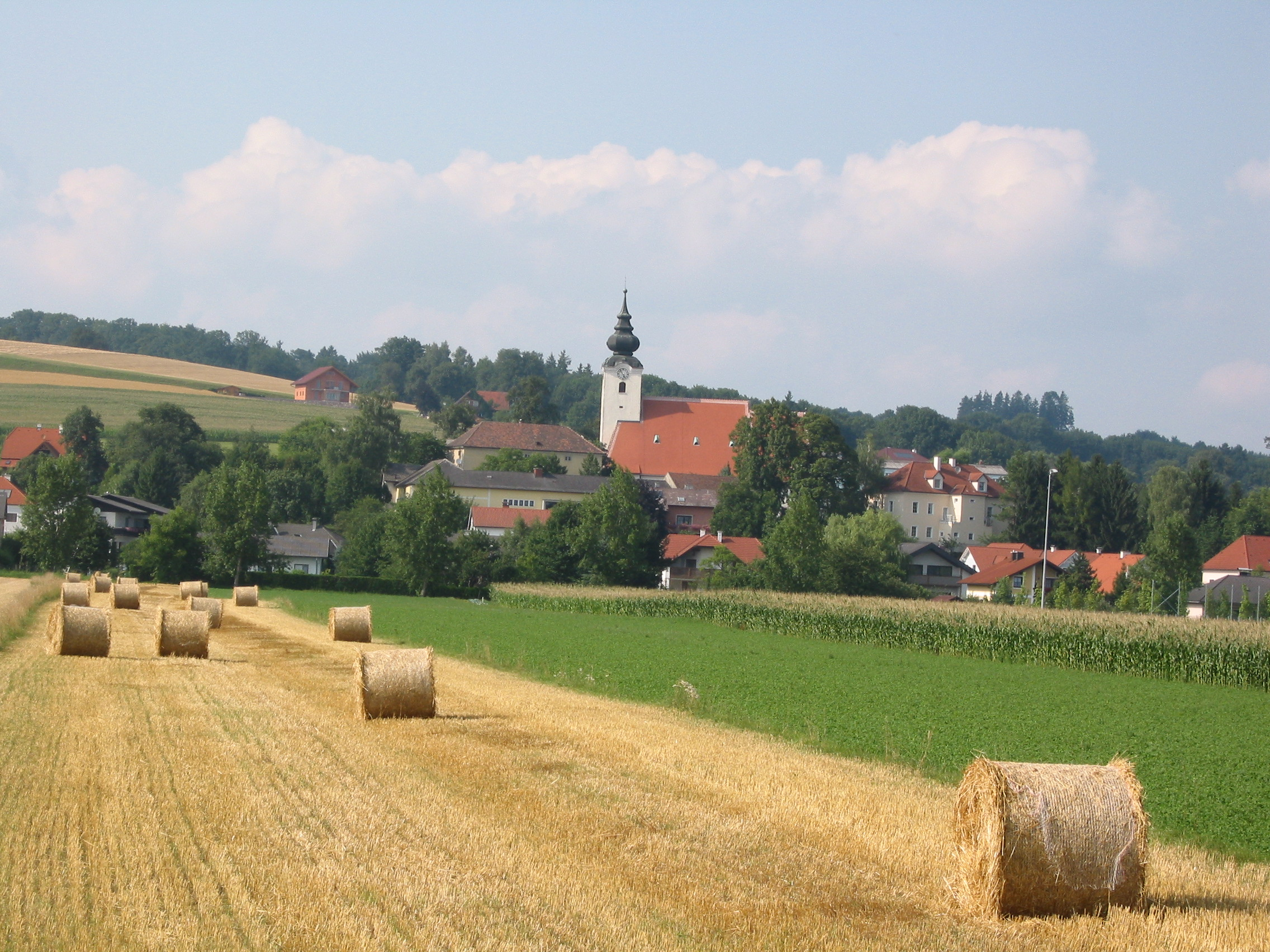
- View of the village

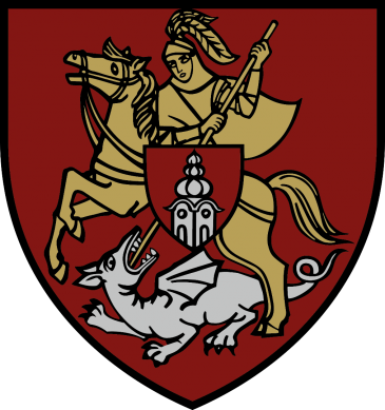
- Coat of arms

- Location within Austria
- Coordinates: 48°7′N 14°56′E
- Country: Austria
- State: Lower Austria
- District: Amstetten

Government
  - Mayor: Liselotte Kashofer

Area
  - Total: 22.83 km^{2} (8.81 sq mi)
- Elevation: 272 m (892 ft)

Population (2018-01-01)
  - Total: 2,886
  - Density: 126.4/km^{2} (327.4/sq mi)
- Time zone: UTC+1 (CET)
  - Summer (DST): UTC+2 (CEST)
- Postal code: 3304
- Area code: 07473
- Website: www.st-georgen-ybbsfelde-gv.at

Sankt Georgen am Ybbsfelde is a town in the district of Amstetten in Lower Austria in Austria.

== Geography ==
St. Georgen am Ybbsfelde lies in the Mostviertel in Lower Austria. About 14 percent of the municipality is forested.
