= Kematen an der Ybbs =

- Municipality
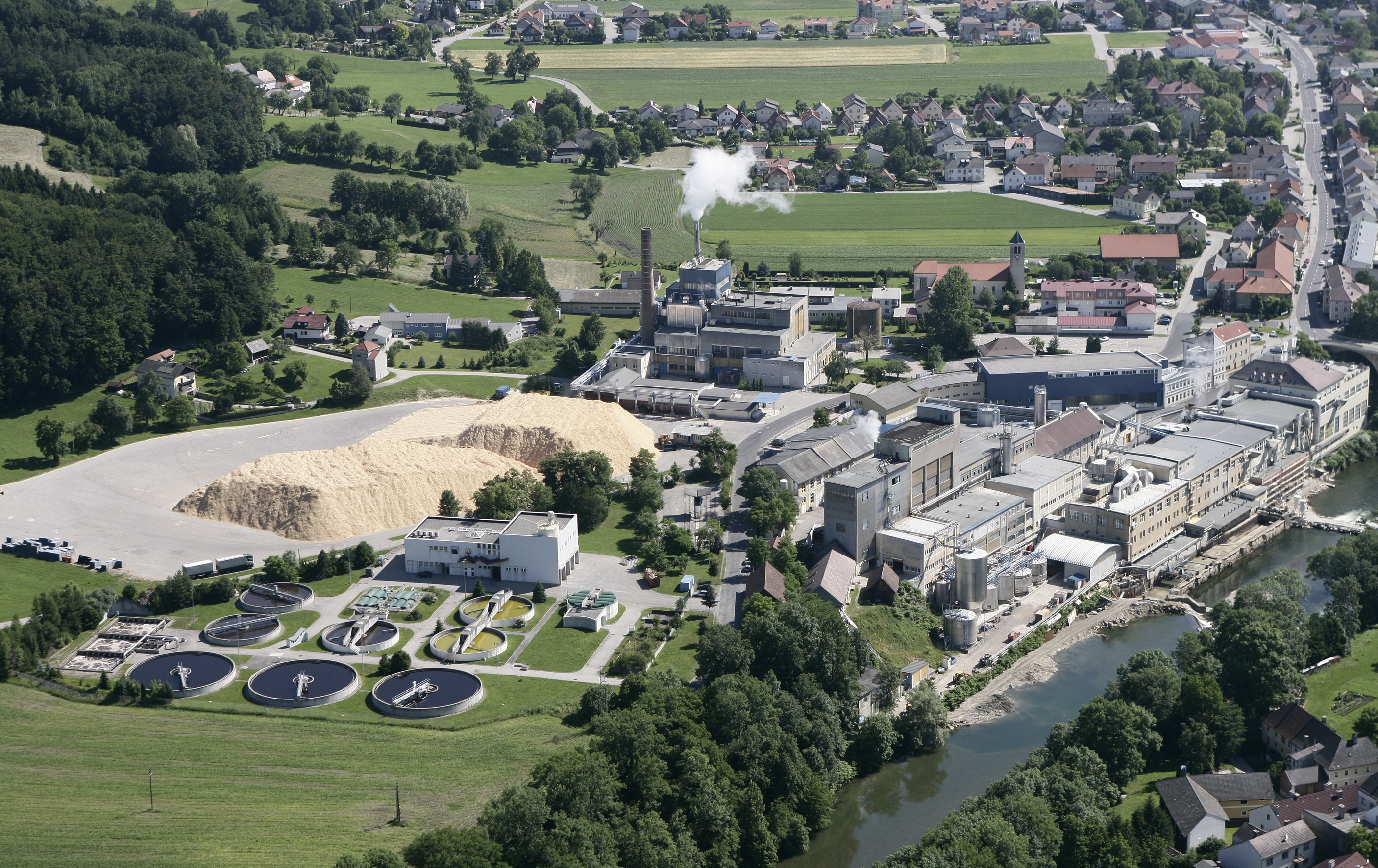
- Aerial view

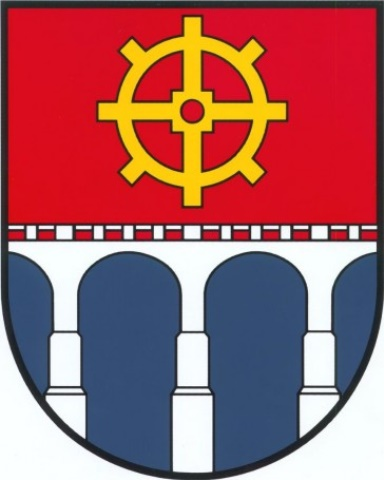
- Coat of arms

- Location within Austria
- Coordinates: 48°2′N 14°46′E
- Country: Austria
- State: Lower Austria
- District: Amstetten

Government
  - Mayor: Juliana Günther (ÖVP)

Area
  - Total: 10.99 km^{2} (4.24 sq mi)
- Elevation: 330 m (1,080 ft)

Population (2018-01-01)
  - Total: 2,625
  - Density: 238.9/km^{2} (618.6/sq mi)
- Time zone: UTC+1 (CET)
  - Summer (DST): UTC+2 (CEST)
- Postal code: 3330
- Area code: 07448
- Website: www.kematen-ybbs.gv.at

Kematen an der Ybbs or Kematen on the Ybbs (Engl.) is a town in the district of Amstetten in Lower Austria, Austria.

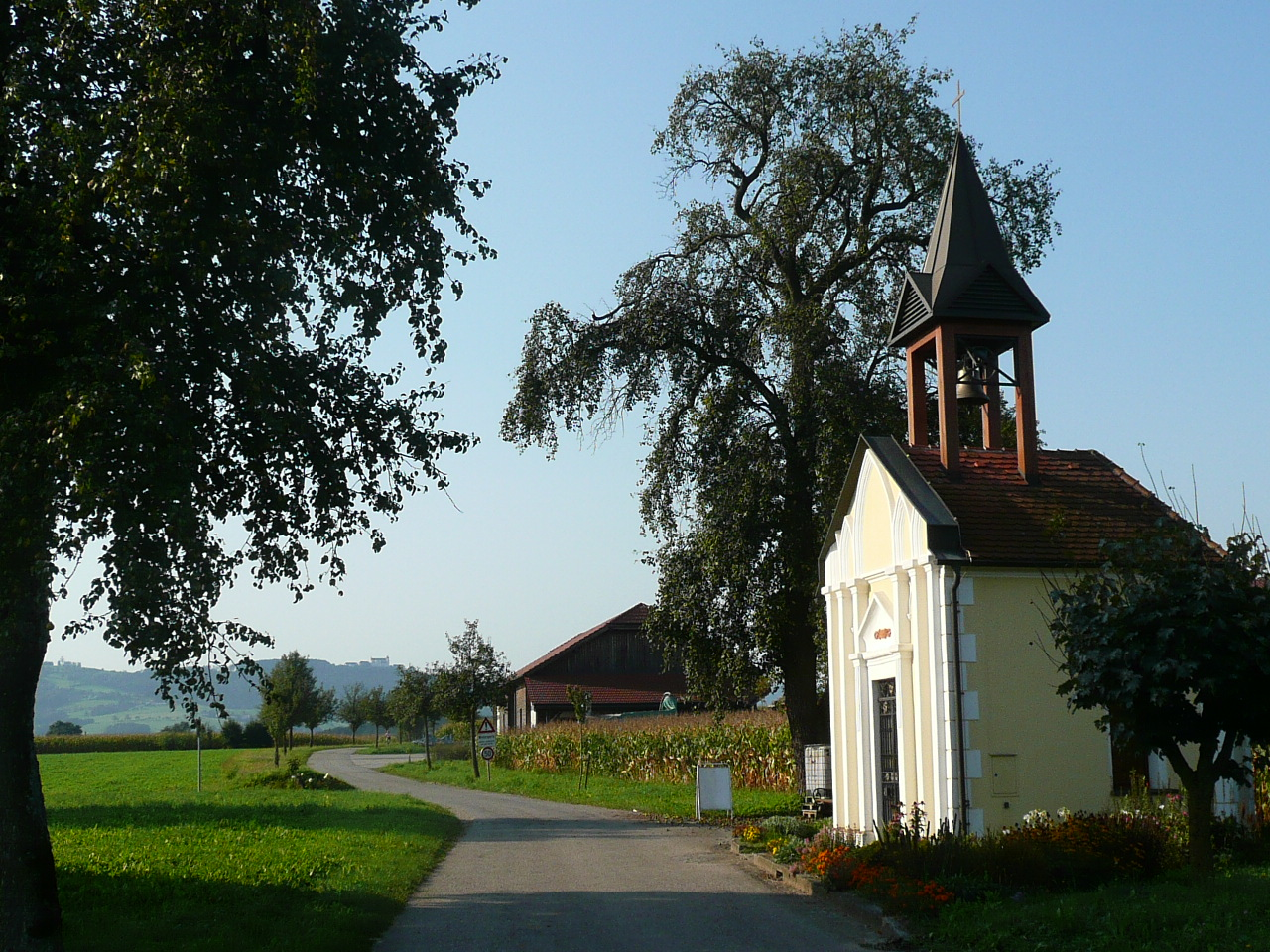
Chapel in Kematen an der Ybbs, Mostviertel, Sonntagberg visible in background.

== Geography ==
Kematen an der Ybbs lies in the Mostviertel in Lower Austria on the Ybbs River. About 22 percent of the municipality is forested.
