= Allhartsberg =

- Municipality
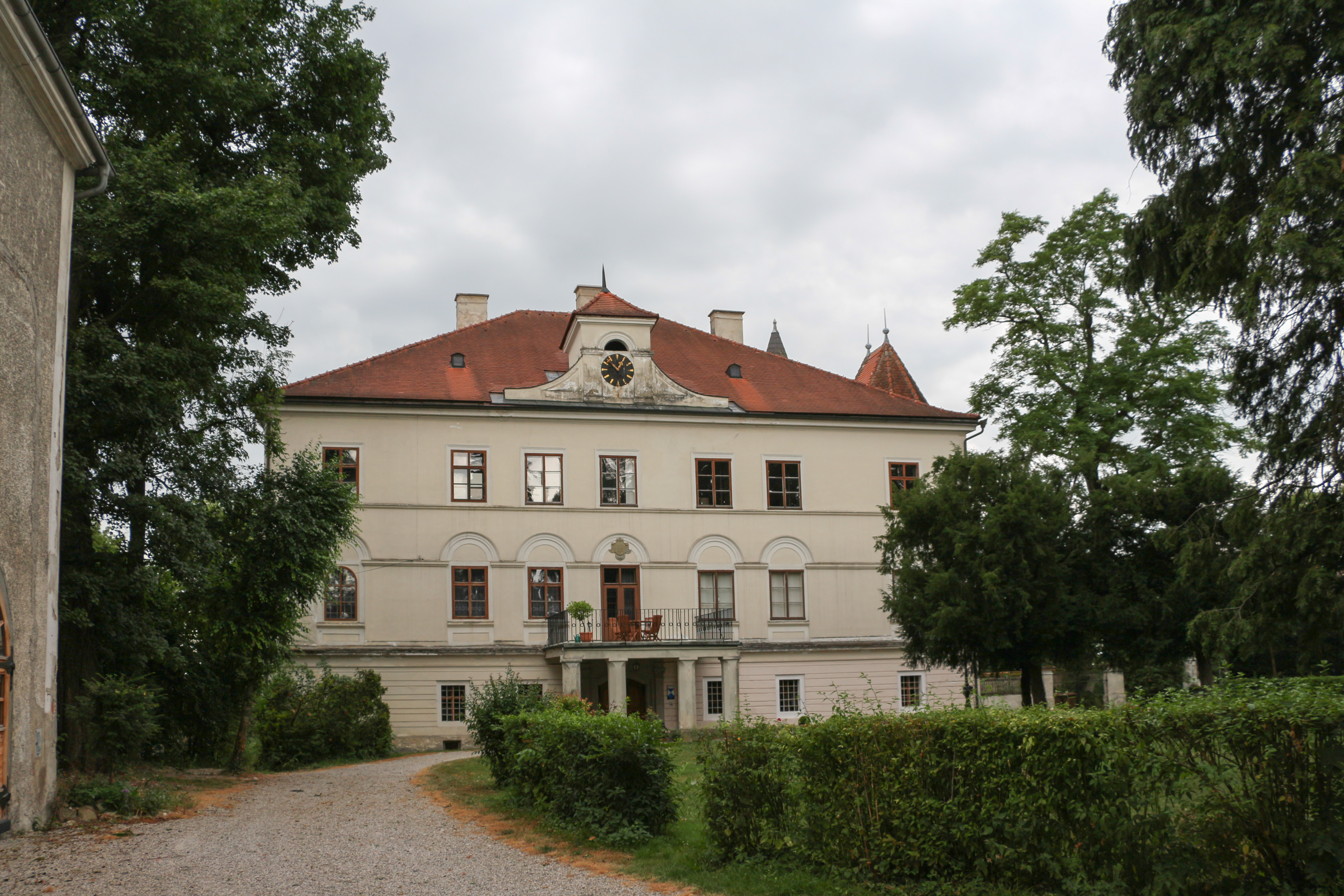
- Kröllendorf Palace

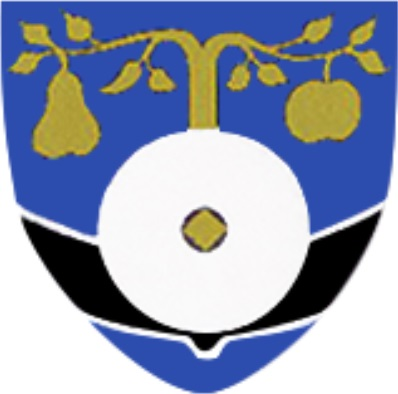
- Coat of arms

- Location within Austria
- Coordinates: 48°2′N 14°48′E
- Country: Austria
- State: Lower Austria
- District: Amstetten

Government
  - Mayor: Anton Kasser (ÖVP)

Area
  - Total: 21.33 km^{2} (8.24 sq mi)
- Elevation: 394 m (1,293 ft)

Population (2018-01-01)
  - Total: 2,108
  - Density: 98.83/km^{2} (256.0/sq mi)
- Time zone: UTC+1 (CET)
  - Summer (DST): UTC+2 (CEST)
- Postal code: 3365
- Area code: 07448
- Website: www.allhartsberg.gv.at

Allhartsberg is a town in the district of Amstetten in Lower Austria in Austria.

Eckes-Granini Austria is headquartered in Allhartsberg.
