= St. Georgen am Reith =

Sankt Georgen am Reith
- Municipality
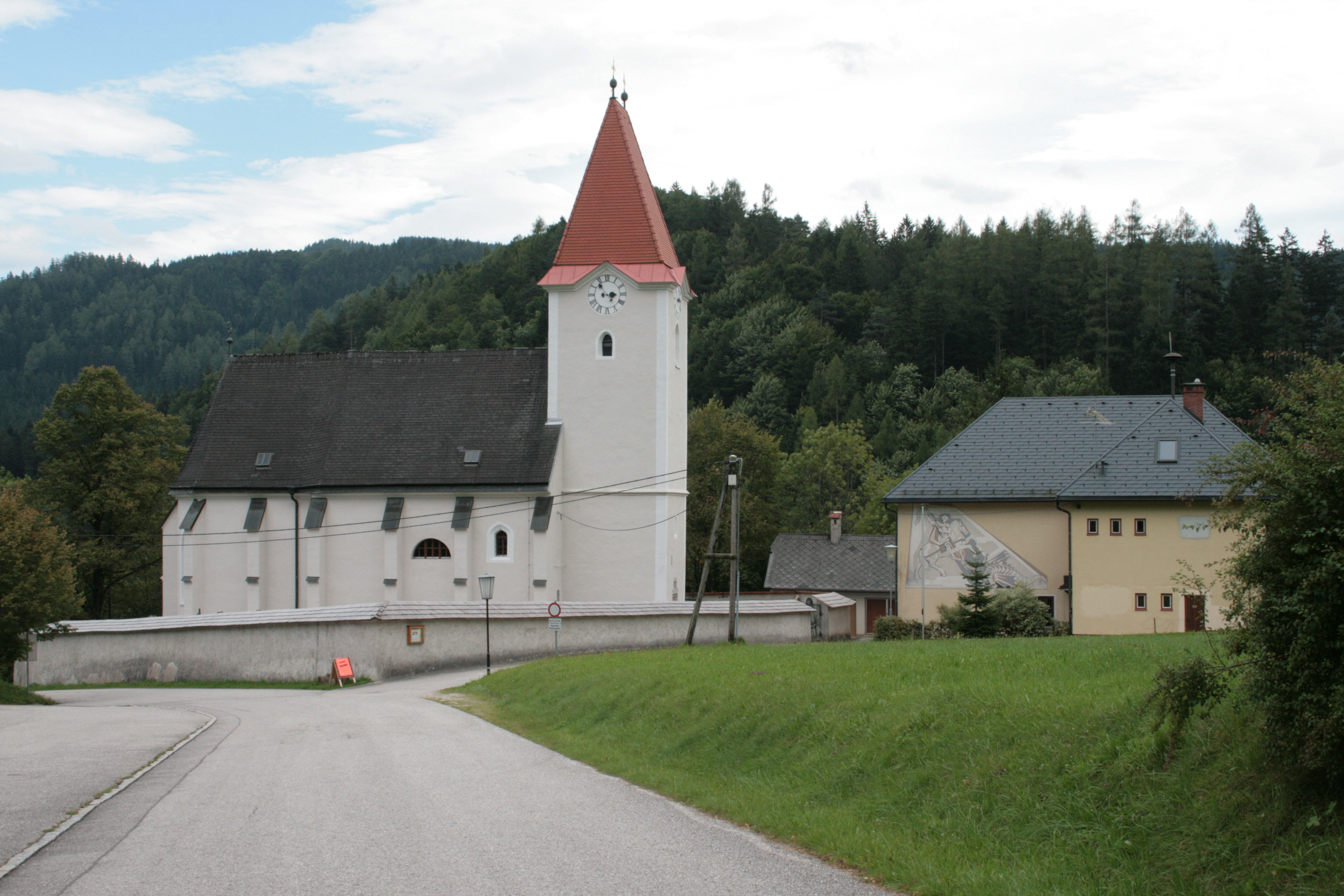
- Church and school building

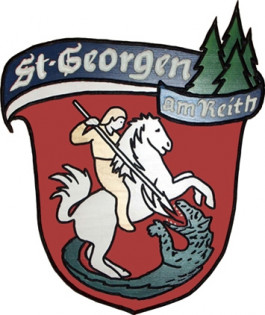
- Coat of arms

- Location within Austria
- Coordinates: 47°50′25″N 14°52′41″E
- Country: Austria
- State: Lower Austria
- District: Amstetten

Government
  - Mayor: Josef Pöchhacker

Area
  - Total: 40.07 km^{2} (15.47 sq mi)
- Elevation: 522 m (1,713 ft)

Population (2018-01-01)
  - Total: 578
  - Density: 14.4/km^{2} (37.4/sq mi)
- Time zone: UTC+1 (CET)
  - Summer (DST): UTC+2 (CEST)
- Postal code: 3344
- Area code: 07464

Sankt Georgen am Reith is a town in the district of Amstetten in Lower Austria in Austria.

== Geography ==
St. Georgen am Reith lies in the Mostviertel in Lower Austria, on a branch of the river Ybbs. About 77 percent of the municipality is forested. The town has two churches, one Catholic and one Protestant, the town hall and an inn.
