= Oed-Öhling =

Oed-Oehling Oed-Öhling
- Municipality
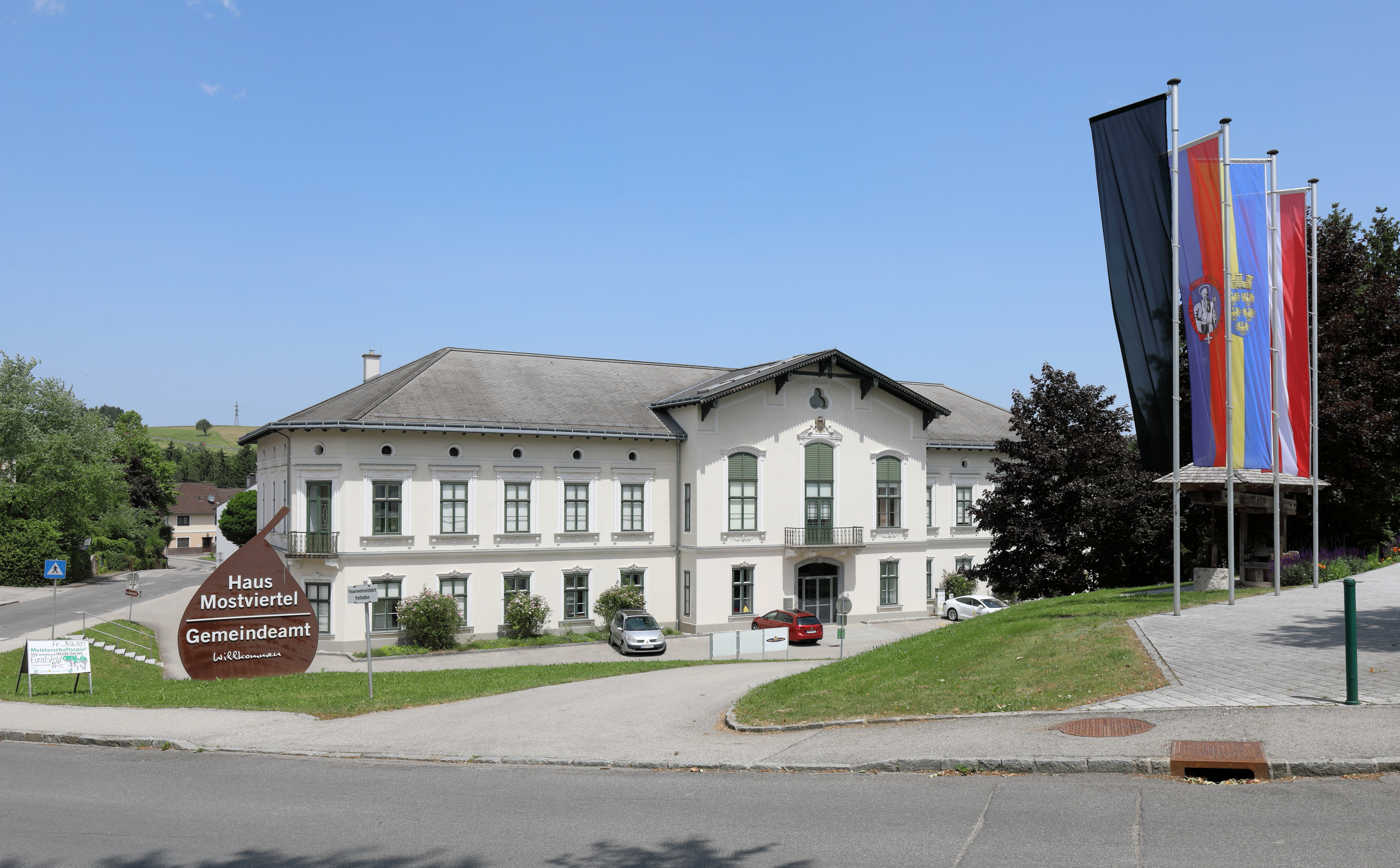
- Municipal office of Öhling

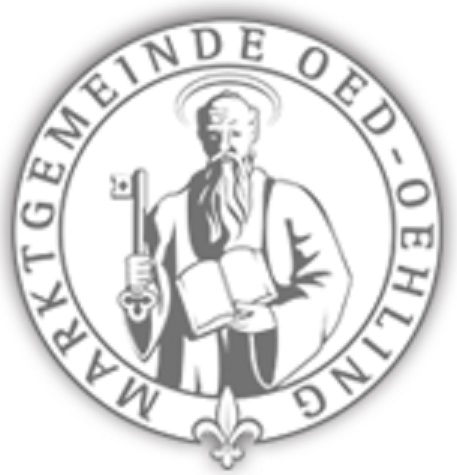
- Coat of arms

- Location within Austria
- Coordinates: 48°6′N 14°46′E
- Country: Austria
- State: Lower Austria
- District: Amstetten

Government
  - Mayor: Josef Dimberger

Area
  - Total: 10.63 km^{2} (4.10 sq mi)
- Elevation: 309 m (1,014 ft)

Population (2018-01-01)
  - Total: 1,884
  - Density: 177.2/km^{2} (459.0/sq mi)
- Time zone: UTC+1 (CET)
  - Summer (DST): UTC+2 (CEST)
- Postal code: 3312, 3362, 3361
- Area code: 07478, 07475, 07476
- Website: www.oed-oehling.at

Oed-Öhling is a town in the district of Amstetten in Lower Austria in northern Austria. Oed has one primary school.

== Geography ==
Oed-Oehling lies in the Mostviertel in Lower Austria. About 15 percent of the municipality is forested.

== Education ==
The nearest secondary school is in Wallsee.
