= Aschbach-Markt =

- Municipality
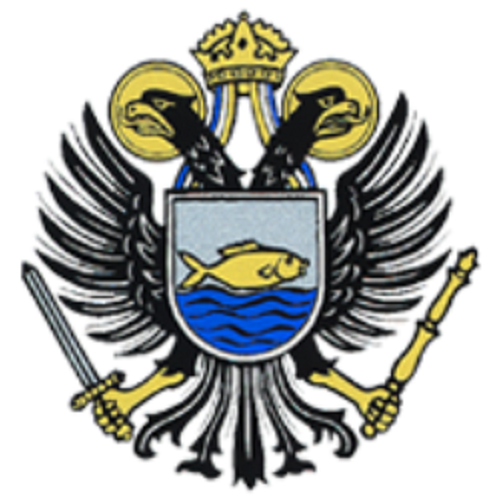
- Coat of arms

- Location within Austria
- Coordinates: 48°4′N 14°45′E
- Country: Austria
- State: Lower Austria
- District: Amstetten

Government
  - Mayor: Martin Schlöglhofer

Area
  - Total: 37.27 km^{2} (14.39 sq mi)
- Elevation: 309 m (1,014 ft)

Population (2018-01-01)
  - Total: 3,811
  - Density: 102.3/km^{2} (264.8/sq mi)
- Time zone: UTC+1 (CET)
  - Summer (DST): UTC+2 (CEST)
- Postal code: 3361
- Area code: 07476
- Website: www.aschbach-markt.gv.at

Aschbach-Markt is a town in the district of Amstetten in Lower Austria in Austria.

== Geography ==
Aschbach-Markt lies in the Mostviertel about 10 km from Amstetten. The Url River flows through the municipality.
