= Winklarn, Austria =

Winklarn
- Municipality
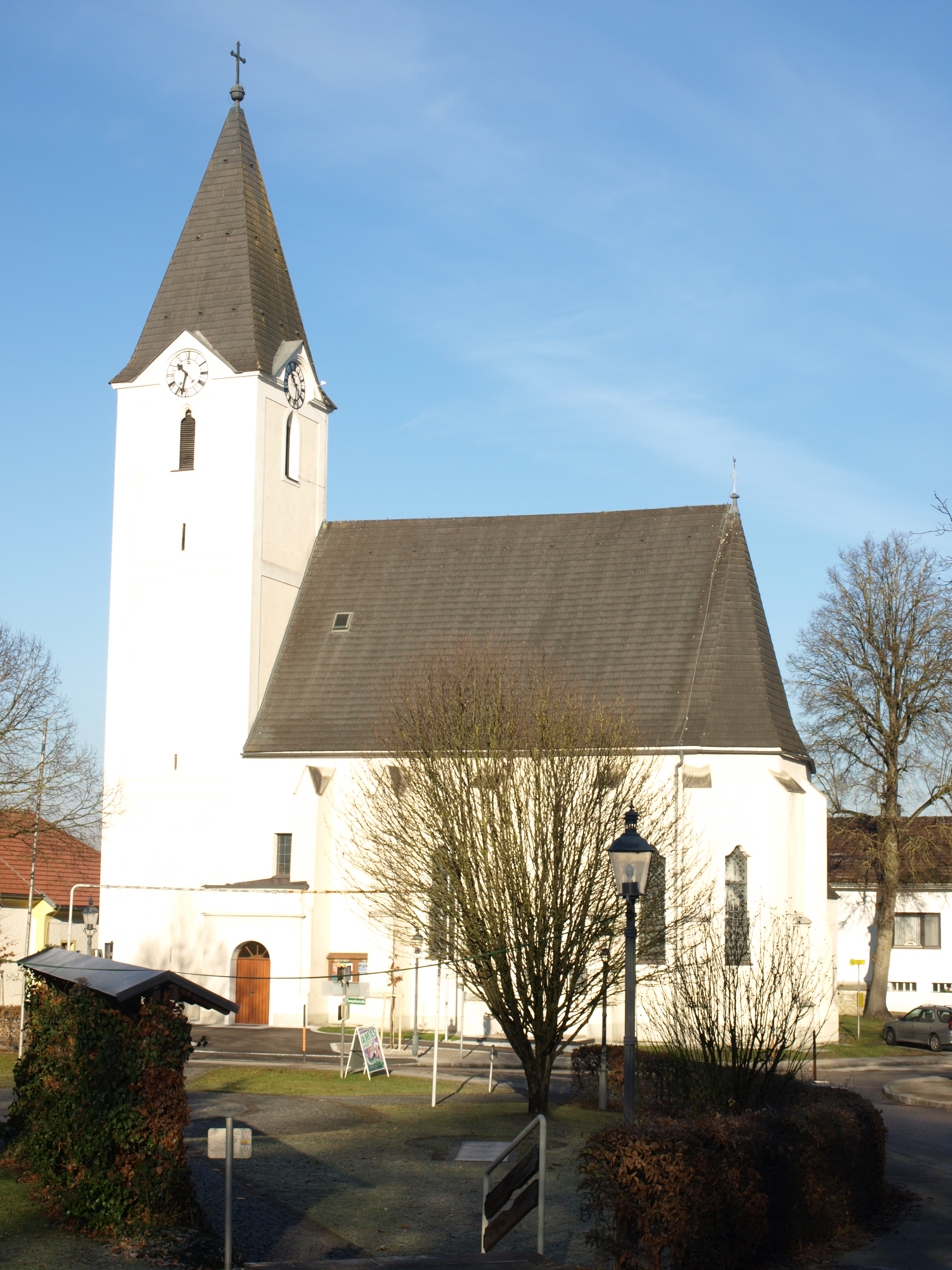
- The catholic church in Winklarn

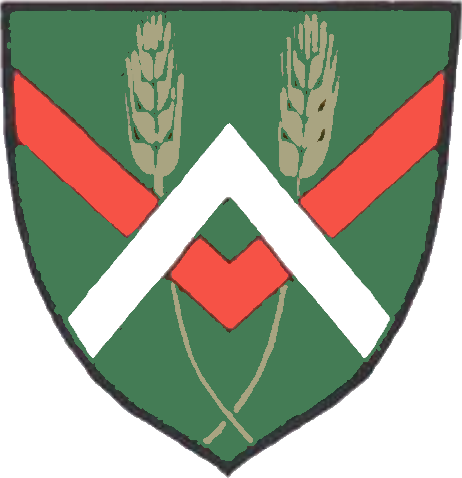
- Coat of arms

- Location within Austria
- Coordinates: 48°5′N 14°51′E
- Country: Austria
- State: Lower Austria
- District: Amstetten

Government
  - Mayor: Gernot Lechner

Area
  - Total: 12.57 km^{2} (4.85 sq mi)
- Elevation: 291 m (955 ft)

Population (2018-01-01)
  - Total: 1,683
  - Density: 133.9/km^{2} (346.8/sq mi)
- Time zone: UTC+1 (CET)
  - Summer (DST): UTC+2 (CEST)
- Postal code: 3300
- Area code: 07472
- Website: www.winklarn.gv.at

Winklarn is a town in the district of Amstetten in Lower Austria in Austria.

== Geography ==
Winklarn lies in the Mostviertel in Lower Austria. About 18.61 percent of the municipality is forested.
