= Haag, Austria =

Haag
- Municipality
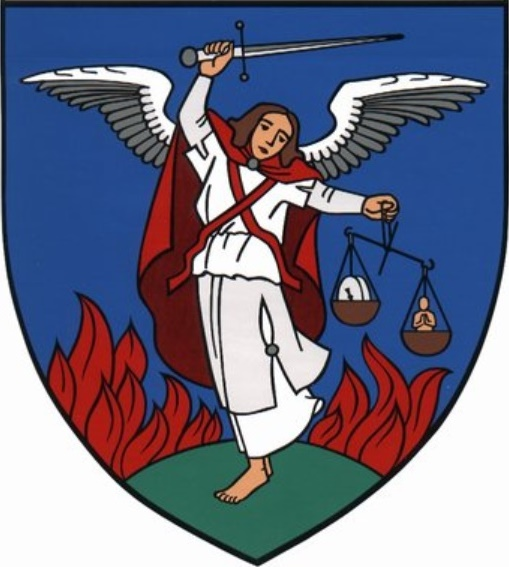
- Coat of arms

- Location within Austria
- Coordinates: 48°1′N 14°48′E
- Country: Austria
- State: Lower Austria
- District: Amstetten

Government
  - Mayor: Lukas Michlmayr

Area
  - Total: 54.96 km^{2} (21.22 sq mi)
- Elevation: 346 m (1,135 ft)

Population (2018-01-01)
  - Total: 5,548
  - Density: 100.9/km^{2} (261.4/sq mi)
- Time zone: UTC+1 (CET)
  - Summer (DST): UTC+2 (CEST)
- Postal code: 3350
- Area code: 07434
- Website: www.haag.gv.at

Haag (Austrian German pronunciation: [haːɡ]) is a town in the district of Amstetten in Lower Austria in Austria.

Haag is the birthplace of Olympic bronze medalist and competitive climber Jessica Pilz.

== Populations ==
Historical population
Year	Pop.	±%
1869	3,929	—
1880	3,915	−0.4%
1890	3,882	−0.8%
1900	4,182	+7.7%
1910	4,273	+2.2%
1923	4,303	+0.7%
1934	4,402	+2.3%
1939	4,492	+2.0%
1951	4,502	+0.2%
1961	4,671	+3.8%
1971	5,060	+8.3%
1981	5,097	+0.7%
1991	5,146	+1.0%
2001	5,170	+0.5%
2011	5,376	+4.0%
