= Hollenstein an der Ybbs =

- Municipality
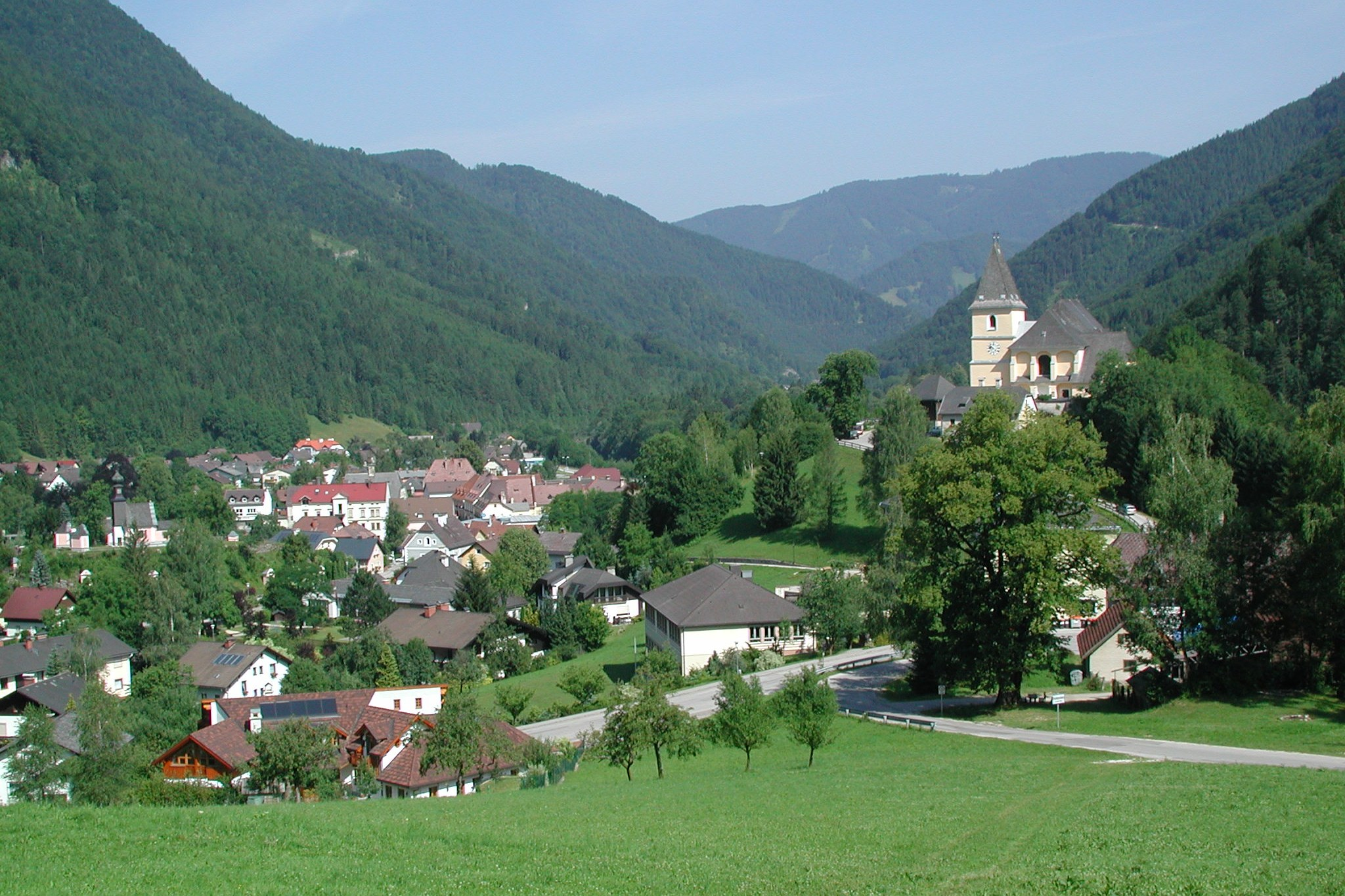

- Location within Austria
- Coordinates: 47°48′N 14°46′E
- Country: Austria
- State: Lower Austria
- District: Amstetten

Government
  - Mayor: Manuela Zebenholzer

Area
  - Total: 126.42 km^{2} (48.81 sq mi)
- Elevation: 485 m (1,591 ft)

Population (2018-01-01)
  - Total: 1,706
  - Density: 13.49/km^{2} (34.95/sq mi)
- Time zone: UTC+1 (CET)
  - Summer (DST): UTC+2 (CEST)
- Postal code: 3343
- Area code: 07445
- Website: www.hollenstein-ybbs.gv.at

Hollenstein an der Ybbs is a municipality in the district of Amstetten in Lower Austria in Austria.

== Geography ==
Hollenstein an der Ybbs lies in the Mostviertel on the Ybbs River. About 86 of the municipality is forested.

== Literature ==
Willibald Bissenberger et al.: Hollenstein an der Ybbs. Ein Dorf im Wandel von etwas mehr als hundert Jahren..., Waidhofen an der Ybbs 2003, ISBN 3-200-00050-3.
