= Ennsdorf =

- Municipality
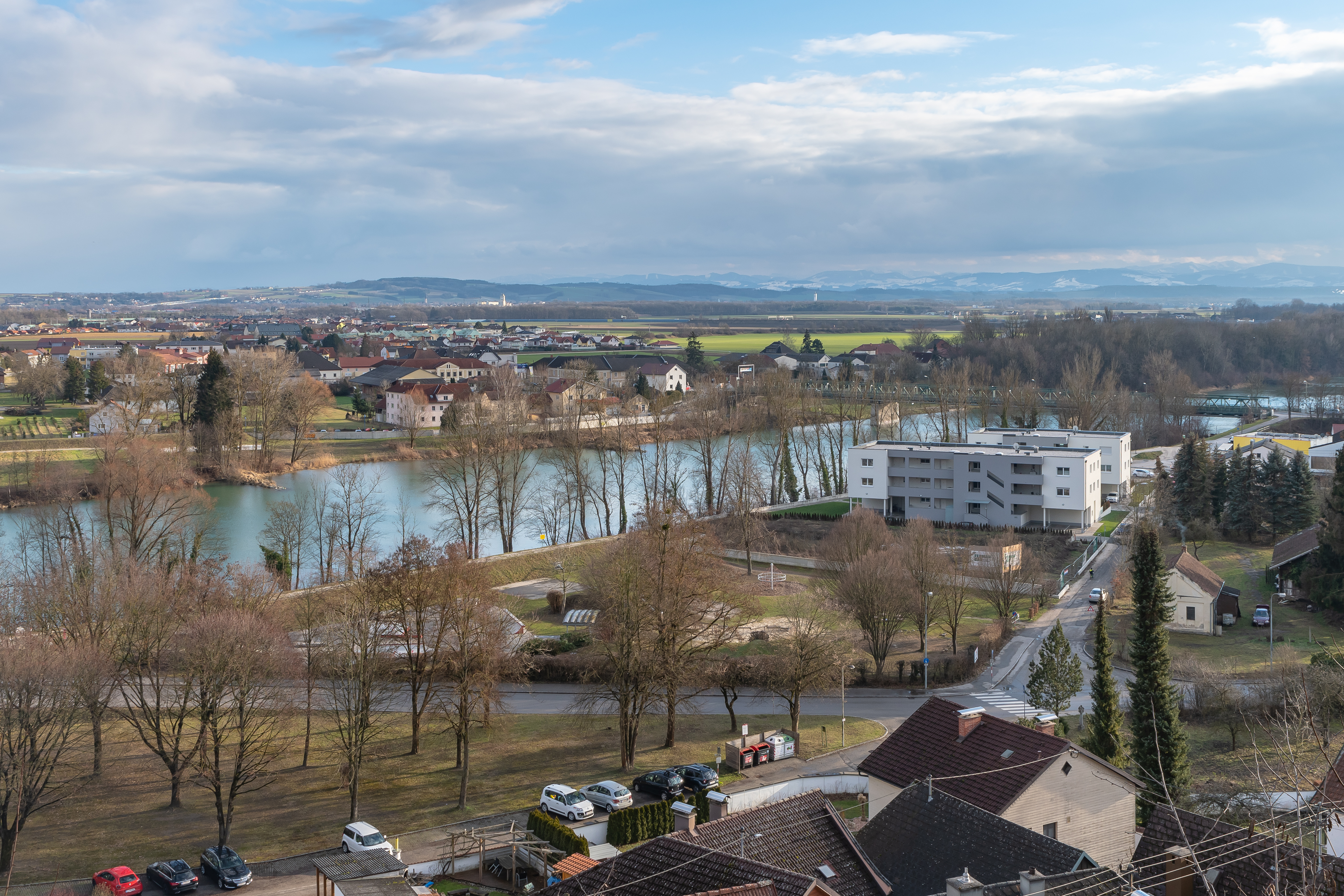
- View of Ennsdorf

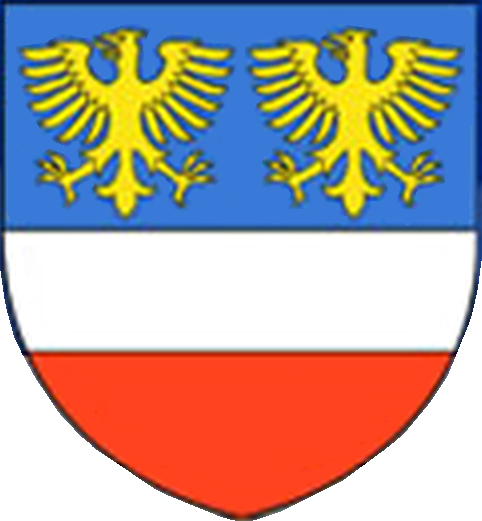
- Coat of arms

- Location within Austria
- Coordinates: 48°12′N 14°26′E
- Country: Austria
- State: Lower Austria
- District: Amstetten

Government
  - Mayor: Alfred Buchberger

Area
  - Total: 7.69 km^{2} (2.97 sq mi)
- Elevation: 250 m (820 ft)

Population (2018-01-01)
  - Total: 3,031
  - Density: 394/km^{2} (1,020/sq mi)
- Time zone: UTC+1 (CET)
  - Summer (DST): UTC+2 (CEST)
- Postal code: 4482
- Area code: 07223
- Website: www.ennsdorf.gv.at

Ennsdorf is a town in the district of Amstetten in Lower Austria in Austria.

== Geography ==
Ennsdorf lies on the Enns River.

== History ==
In the Roman empire it was part of the region Noricum. In the year 1244 it was first mentioned in records. All times it was strongly bound to the city of Enns, although it belonged until 1779 to St. Valentin.

On 5 May 1945, SS units replaced approx. 800 soldiers based in Ennsdorf. On 7 May, negotiations to surrender failed. On 8 May 1945, Major General Stanley Eric Reinhart expected 15,000 to 16,000 German PWs to cross the bridge at Ennsdorf to surrender. On 10 May, Soviet soldiers took over.

== Politics ==
The distribution of 21 mandates in the town council is: SPÖ 13, ÖVP 6, BL-EW 1, FPÖ 1.
