= Zeillern =

- Municipality
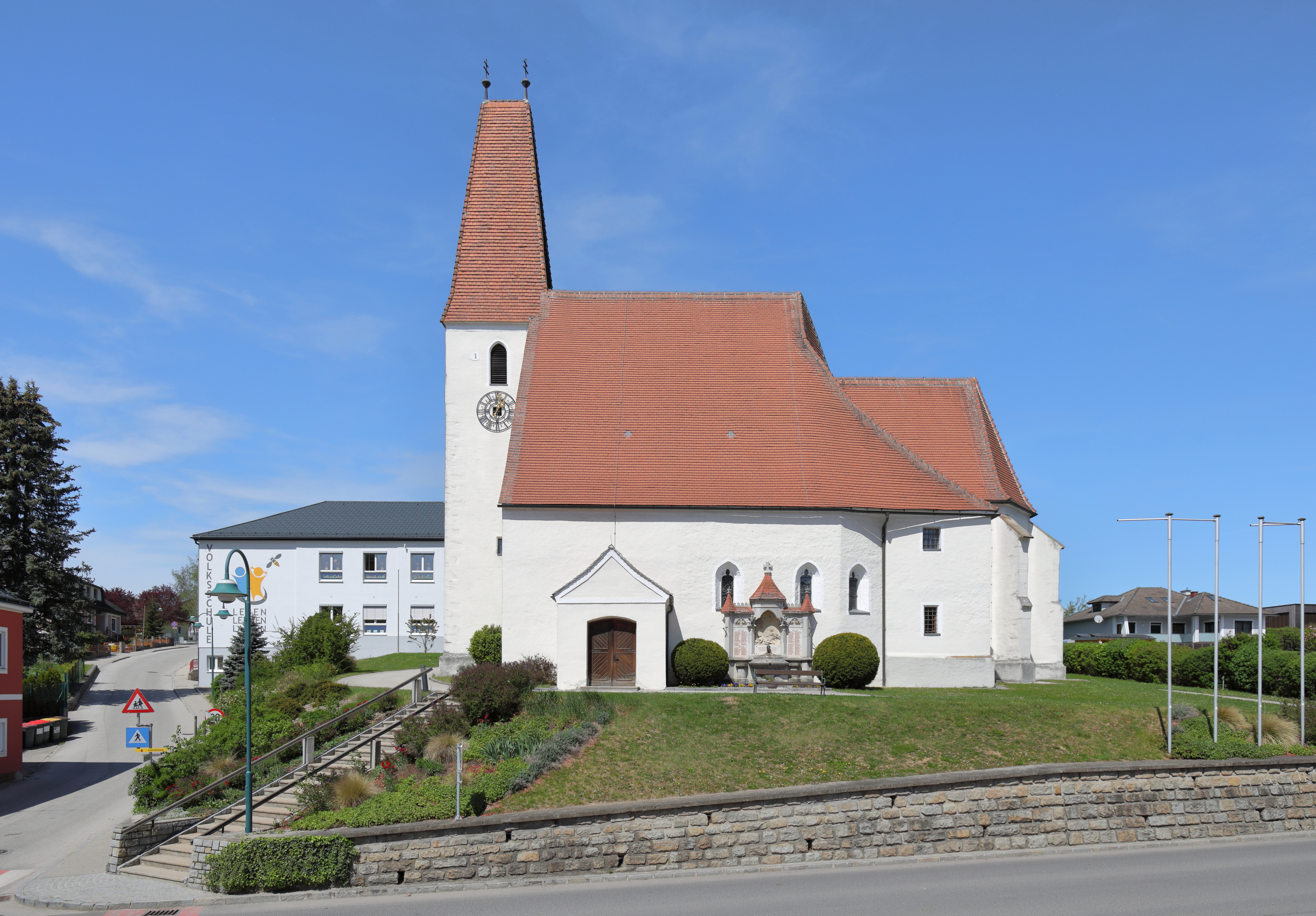
- Centre of Zeillern with parish church

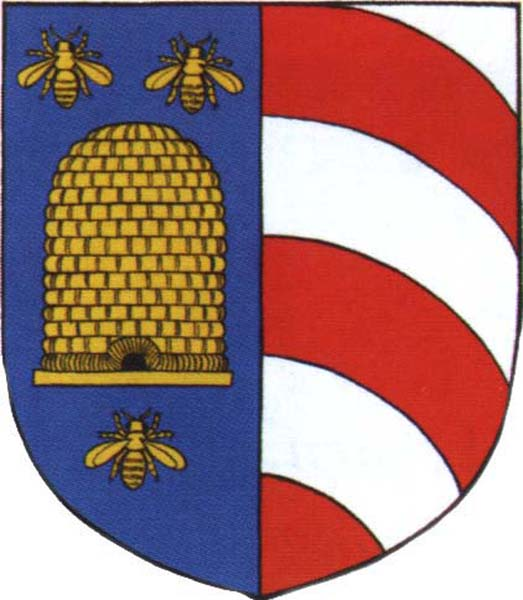
- Coat of arms

- Location within Austria
- Coordinates: 48°7′N 14°48′E
- Country: Austria
- State: Lower Austria
- District: Amstetten

Government
  - Mayor: Friedrich Pallinger

Area
  - Total: 21.57 km^{2} (8.33 sq mi)
- Elevation: 290 m (950 ft)

Population (2018-01-01)
  - Total: 1,865
  - Density: 86.46/km^{2} (223.9/sq mi)
- Time zone: UTC+1 (CET)
  - Summer (DST): UTC+2 (CEST)
- Postal code: 3311, 3312, 3362
- Area code: 07472
- Website: www.zeillern.gv.at

Zeillern is a town in the district of Amstetten in Lower Austria in Austria.

== Geography ==
Zeillern lies in the heart of the Mostviertel in Lower Austria. About 15.41 per cent of the municipality is forested.
