= Opponitz =

- Municipality
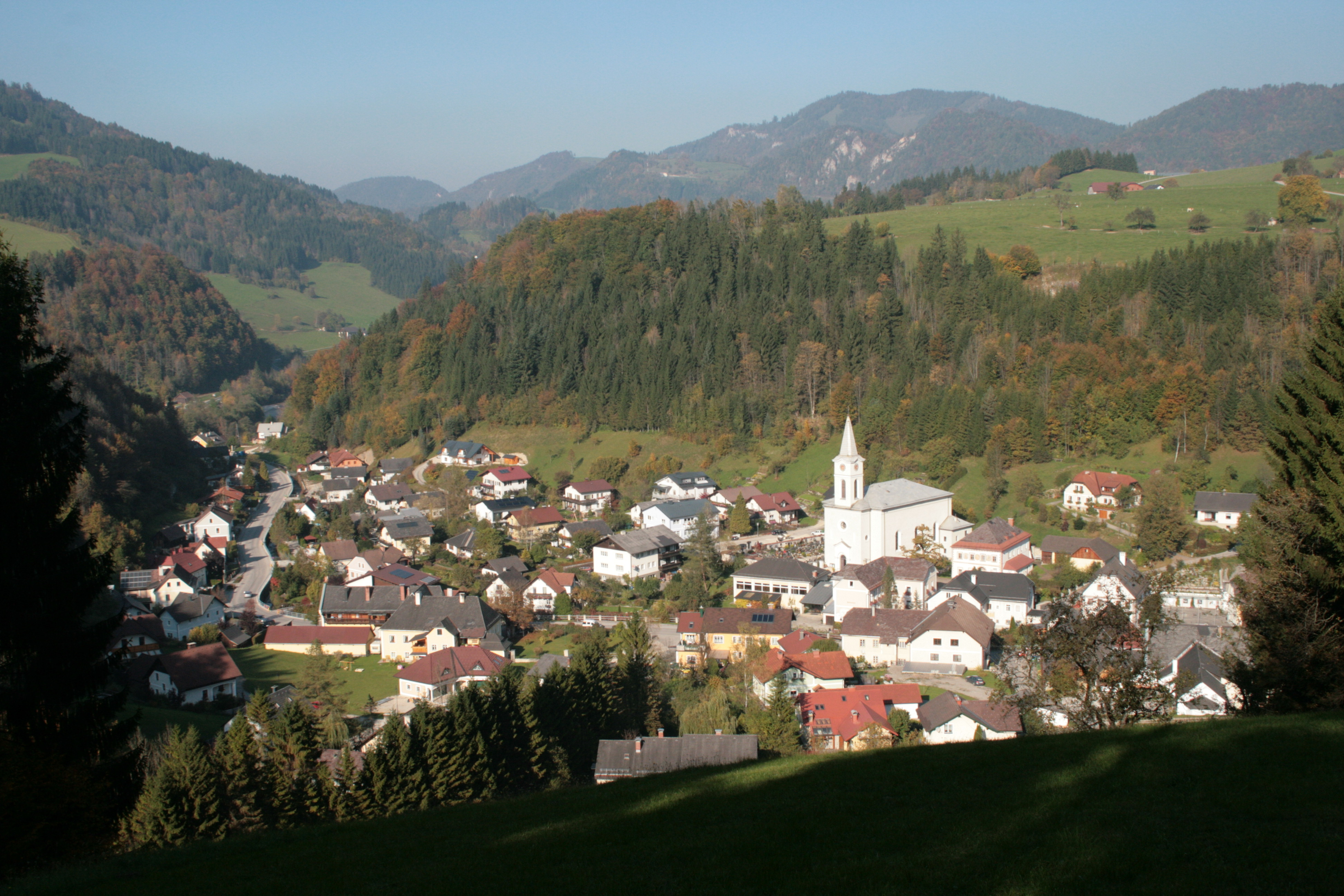

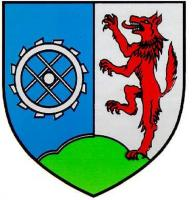
- Coat of arms

- Location within Austria
- Coordinates: 47°52′N 14°49′E
- Country: Austria
- State: Lower Austria
- District: Amstetten

Government
  - Mayor: Johann Lueger

Area
  - Total: 39.66 km^{2} (15.31 sq mi)
- Elevation: 422 m (1,385 ft)

Population (2018-01-01)
  - Total: 947
  - Density: 23.9/km^{2} (61.8/sq mi)
- Time zone: UTC+1 (CET)
  - Summer (DST): UTC+2 (CEST)
- Postal code: 3342
- Area code: 07444
- Website: www.opponitz-gv.at

Opponitz is a town in the district of Amstetten in Lower Austria in Austria.

== Geography ==
Opponitz lies on the Ybbs River in the Mostviertel in Lower Austria. About 72.52 percent of the municipality is forested.
