= Neustadtl an der Donau =

- Municipality
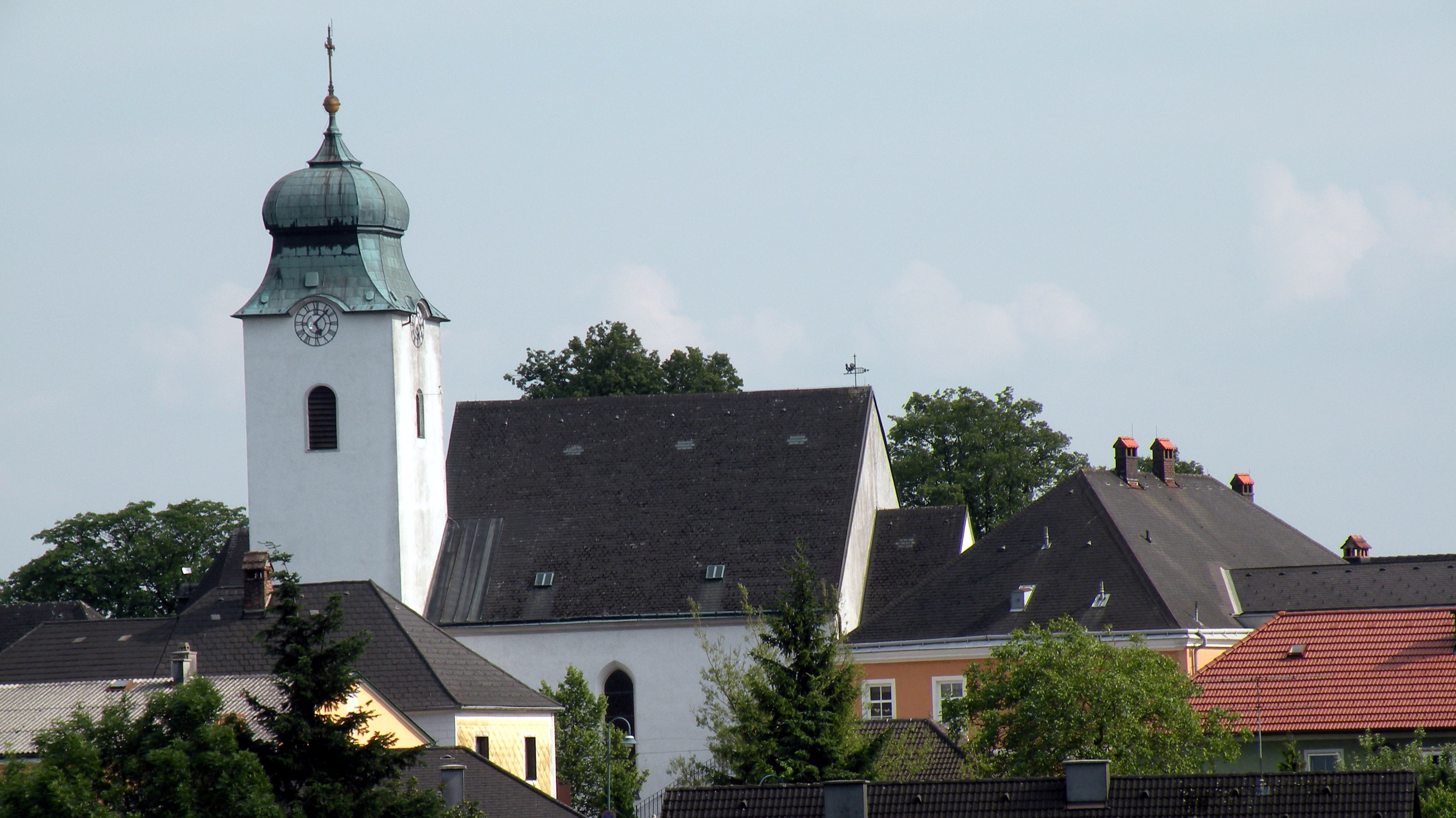
- Church of Saint James the Elder

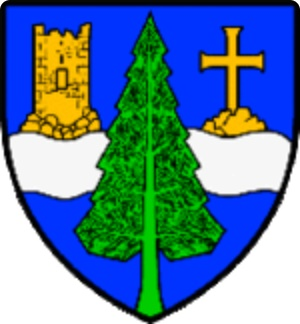
- Coat of arms

- Location within Austria
- Coordinates: 48°11′N 14°54′E
- Country: Austria
- State: Lower Austria
- District: Amstetten

Government
  - Mayor: Franz Kriener (ÖVP)

Area
  - Total: 47.89 km^{2} (18.49 sq mi)
- Elevation: 509 m (1,670 ft)

Population (2018-01-01)
  - Total: 2,143
  - Density: 44.75/km^{2} (115.9/sq mi)
- Time zone: UTC+1 (CET)
  - Summer (DST): UTC+2 (CEST)
- Postal code: 3323
- Area code: 07471
- Website: www.neustadtl.at

Neustadtl an der Donau is a town in the district of Amstetten in Lower Austria in Austria.

== Geography ==
Neustadtl an der Donau lies in the Mostviertel in Lower Austria on the Danube. About 41 percent of the municipality is forested.
