= Wolfsbach, Lower Austria =

Wolfsbach
- Municipality
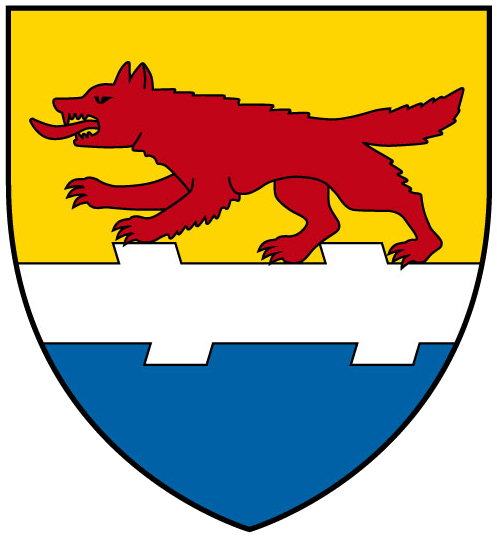
- Coat of arms

- Location within Austria
- Coordinates: 48°4′N 14°40′E
- Country: Austria
- State: Lower Austria
- District: Amstetten

Government
  - Mayor: Franz Sturm

Area
  - Total: 31 km^{2} (12 sq mi)
- Elevation: 384 m (1,260 ft)

Population (2018-01-01)
  - Total: 2,011
  - Density: 65/km^{2} (170/sq mi)
- Time zone: UTC+1 (CET)
  - Summer (DST): UTC+2 (CEST)
- Postal code: 3364
- Area code: 07477
- Website: www.wolfsbach.gv.at

Wolfsbach is a town in the district of Amstetten in Lower Austria in Austria.

== Geography ==
Wolfsbach lies in the Mostviertel in Lower Austria. About 6.84 percent of the municipality is forested.
