= Ybbs =

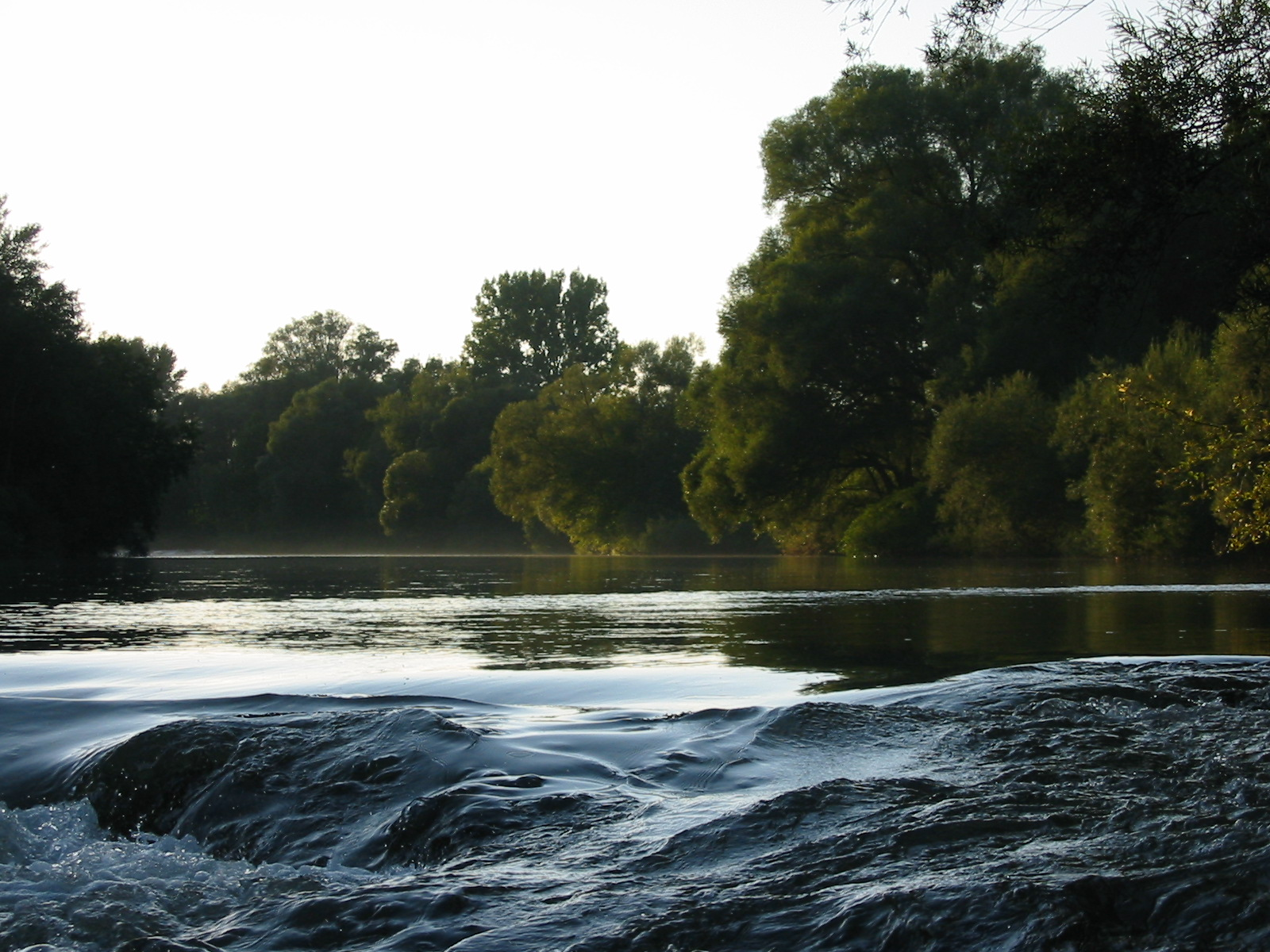
- The Ybbs near Amstetten

Location
- Country: Austria
- State: Lower Austria

Physical characteristics
- Source
  - location: near Mariazell
  - coordinates: 47.7603°N 15.2053°E
  - elevation: 262m
- Mouth
  - location: Danube in Ybbs an der Donau
  - coordinates: 48.1701°N 15.1023°E
- Length: 133.9 km (83.2 mi)
- Basin size: 1,291 km^{2} (498 sq mi)

Basin features
- Progression: Danube→ Black Sea

Ybbs (German pronunciation: [ˈɪps]) is a river in Lower Austria. Its drainage basin is 1,291 km^{2} (498 sq mi).

Its source is located on the Zellerrain Pass near Mariazell. In the beginning, the river is called Weiße Ois, then onwards from the border between Lower Austria and Styria up to Lunz am See it is called Ois. From there until its confluence to the Danube at Ybbs an der Donau, it is finally called Ybbs.

The Ybbs has a strongly meandering course and flows for around 134 km (83 mi) from the South in a northward direction. Along the river there are many metal and lumber industry plants.

The most important towns on the Ybbs are Lunz am See, Göstling an der Ybbs, Hollenstein an der Ybbs, Opponitz, Ybbsitz, Waidhofen an der Ybbs, Amstetten, and Ybbs an der Donau.

The valley of the river Ybbs is called: Ybbs Valley, or Ybbs Field (German: Ybbsfeld). In 788, it was the site of a battle, between Franks and Avars.

== See also ==
- Ybbs Valley Railway

== Sources ==
- Pohl, Walter (2018). The Avars: A Steppe Empire in Central Europe, 567-822. Ithaca and London: Cornell University Press. ISBN 9781501729409.
