= Isaac Samuel Reggio =

Austro-Italian scholar and rabbi

Isaac Samuel Reggio (1784–1855)

Isaac Samuel Reggio (YaShaR) (Hebrew: יש"ר, יצחק שמואל רג'יו) (15 August 1784 – 29 August 1855) was an Austro-Italian scholar and rabbi. He was born and died in Gorizia.

== Biography ==
Reggio studied Hebrew and rabbinics under his father, Abraham Vita, later rabbi of Gorizia, acquiring at the same time in the gymnasium a knowledge of secular science and languages. Reggio's father, one of the liberal rabbis who supported Hartwig Wessely, paid special attention to the religious instruction of his son, who displayed unusual aptitude in Hebrew, and at the age of fourteen wrote a metrical dirge on the death of Moses Ḥefeẓ, rabbi of Gorizia.

Besides Italian, his mother tongue, Reggio knew French, German, and Latin, and he studied several Semitic languages in addition to Hebrew. He possessed a phenomenally clear, if not profound, intellect, and as mathematics offered the widest field for his analytical talent, it was at first his favorite study. In 1802 he published in the Neuwieder Zeitung the solution of a difficult mathematical problem, which gave him a reputation as a mathematician. He discovered also a new demonstration of the Pythagorean theorem, which was praised by Cauchy, the well-known French mathematician.

In 1803 Reggio moved to Trieste, where for three years he was a tutor in the house of a wealthy family. There he made a friend of Mordecai Isaac de Cologna, at whose death (1824) Reggio wrote a funeral oration in Italian. He returned to Gorizia in 1807, where one year later he married the daughter of a wealthy man and settled down to a life of independent study. When the province of Illyria (1810) became a French dependency, Reggio was appointed by the French governor professor of belles-lettres, geography, and history, and chancellor of the lycée of Gorizia. But three years later Illyria became again an Austrian province, and the Austrian anti-Jewish laws compelled Reggio to resign.

He then devoted himself exclusively to Jewish literature and cognate subjects; he even studied kabbalah, but the more he studied it the greater grew his aversion to its mystical and allegedly illogical doctrines. Taking Moses Mendelssohn and Hartwig Wessely as guides, he next made his name celebrated in connection with religious philosophy, and became indeed to the Italian Jews what Mendelssohn was to his German co-religionists. In 1822 an imperial decree having been issued that no one might be appointed rabbi who had not graduated in philosophy, Reggio published at Venice an appeal, in Italian, for the establishment of a rabbinical seminary, arguing that just as the emperor did not desire rabbis devoid of philosophical training, neither did the Jews desire rabbis who had had no rabbinical education. This appeal resulted in the establishment of a rabbinical college at Padua, for which Reggio drew up the statutes and the educational program.

Following the example of Mendelssohn, Reggio endeavored to extend the knowledge of Hebrew among the Jewish masses by translating the Bible into Italian and writing a commentary thereon. His simple but clear and attractive style made a deep impression not only on the Italian but even on the German Jews. Although he believed that in the main the text of the Bible has been well guarded against corruption, he admitted that involuntary scribal errors had slipped in and that it would be no sin to correct them. The reproaches of Meïr Randegger (d. 1853) concerning his Biblical corrections Reggio answered by stating that every one was permitted to interpret the text according to his understanding, provided such interpretations were not in opposition to the principles of the Jewish religion.

An opponent of casuistry, Reggio rejected aggadic Biblical interpretations and the pilpulistic study of the Talmud. He was persecuted by many German rabbis on account of his liberal views; even his father did not wholly approve of his methods. Nevertheless, in 1846, after his father's death, the community of Göritz insisted upon his accepting the rabbinical office; he agreed, but declined to receive the salary attached to it. After occupying the position for ten years he resigned.

== His works ==
Reggio was a voluminous writer. He published:

- Ma'amar Torah min ha-Shamayim (Vienna, 1818), on the divine authority of the Jewish law, an introduction to his Italian translation of the Torah
- Sefer Torat Elohim (ib. 1821), the Pentateuch, with an Italian language translation and a Hebrew commentary
- Ha-Torah weha-Pilusufiah (ib. 1827)
- Beḥinat ha-Dat 'im Perush we-He'arot (ib. 1833), an edition of Elijah Delmedigo's Beḥinat ha-Dat, with a commentary and notes
- Iggerot Yashar (ib. 1834-36), a collection of exegetical, philosophical, and historical treatises in the form of letters to a friend
- Ma'amar ha-Tiglaḥat (ib. 1835), a decision ("pesaḳ") permitting the shaving of the beard on Chol HaMoed; this work called forth two protests, one by Jacob Ezekiel ha-Levi, entitled Tisporet Lulyanit, Berlin, 1839, and one by Reggio's father, entitled Tiglaḥat ha-Ma'amar, Leghorn, 1844)
- Aben Esra's Handschriftlicher Kommentar Uber Exodus (Prague 1840) Printed and Published by M. I. Landau in Leipzig by C. L. Fritzsche.
- Mafteaḥ el Megillat Ester (Vienna, 1841)
- Mazkeret Yashar (ib. 1849), a bibliographical sketch (presented to his friends in his sixty-fifth year) in which he enumerates 103 works
- Beḥinat ha-Ḳabbalah (Göritz, 1852)
- Yalḳuṭ Yashar (ib. 1854), collectanea, including a defense by Reggio of the opinion which attributes the Book of Isaiah 40-66 to an author who lived after the Babylonian captivity.

He wrote also a metrical Italian translation of the Book of Isaiah (Udine, 1831), and translated into Italian prose the books of Joshua, Ruth, and Lamentations, the tractate Pirkei Avot, and Moses Mendelssohn's correspondence with Lavater on religion. In the notes to Elijah Delmedigo's Beḥinat ha-Dat Reggio often supplements or criticizes this work; he, moreover, refutes Aaron Chorin in notes 8, 15-19, and attacks Kabbalah in notes 9-13. It may be noticed that thirteen years previously Moses Kunitzer printed, in his Sefer ha-Meẓaref, Reggio's letter in defense of kabbalah.

Reggio was an indefatigable contributor to most of the Jewish journals of his time and an able apologist. He was also the editor of Bikkure 'Ittim ha-Ḥadashim, the Hebrew part of Busch's Jahrbücher (Vienna, 1845), and Meged Geresh Yeraḥim, a supplement to the Central-Organ für Jüdische Interessen (ib. 1849). It may be added that Reggio was a painter of considerable ability. There are more than two hundred drawings and paintings by him, including portraits of many Jewish celebrities, and a map drawn by him is preserved in the library of Trieste. In 1812 he inscribed the whole Book of Esther on a small piece of parchment one and a half handbreadths long. He left also a great number of unpublished writings, among which are sermons and poems in Hebrew and Italian.

== His philosophy ==
Reggio's most important works are Ha-Torah weha-Pilusufiah, Mafteaḥ el Megillat Ester, and Beḥinat ha-Ḳabbalah. The first, a religious-philosophical essay in four sections ("ma'amarim"), was written as an answer to the rabbis of the old school who protested against the establishment of the rabbinical college at Padua. It should be explained that Reggio applies the term "philosophy" to all studies outside the Talmud and rabbinics. Reggio not only endeavors to reconcile the Jewish religion with modern science, but attempts to prove that they are indispensable to each other. One chapter, entitled "Ha-'Olam weha-Adam," was republished by Martinet in his Tif'eret Yisrael (Bamberg, 1837). Another chapter, in which was discussed whether the Torah is in opposition to kabbalah, was stricken out by the censor. Later this chapter was plagiarized by S. M. Rosenthal, who published it in Fürst's edition of Leon of Modena's Ari Nohem.

The Mafteaḥ el Megillat Ester is an introduction to the Book of Esther, and deserves special notice in consideration of its originality. Having concluded that the Persian king in that book was Darius Hystaspes, Reggio shows that the main object of the writer was to prove that Darius was the first to establish the post. Analyzing the text carefully, Reggio maintains that Mordecai was by no means such a great man as the Rabbis declare him to have been, but that, on the contrary, he was an ordinary Jew; for he not only gave no religious education to his adopted daughter Esther, but he even commanded her to deny her race and religion. His refusal to bow before Haman was unnecessary, as such an act would not have violated any Jewish religious law. Even when he was informed of the imminence of the danger to his co-religionists consequent upon his senseless refusal, he did not resort to prayer and fasting; it was Esther who did that. His inhumanity is evidenced by his command to slaughter women and children (Esth. 8:11). Afterward, when Mordecai attained great power, he did nothing to better the lot of his brethren in Jerusalem (compare Neh. 9:36-37). This view of Reggio's provoked a protest from Isaac Baer Levinsohn, and was violently criticized by Mendelson.

The Beḥinat ha-Ḳabbalah is an edition of Leon of Modena's two pamphlets Ḳol Sakal and Sha'agat Aryeh; these Reggio provided with a preface, and with one hundred critical notes forming the second part of the work. In the preface Reggio outlined Leon of Modena's biography. The notes are independent treatises reviewing Modena's works chapter by chapter, now supplementing, now refuting his views. Reggio's main argument is that most of the Talmudic ordinances were not intended for perpetual observance; they were practiced only by the rigorous Pharisees. It was not until much later, he declares, that the casuists ("poseḳim") established such ordinances as a part of the Law. Consequently, Modena was, in many cases wrong in attacking the Talmudists. Reggio's theory has been refuted by Simon Stern in the preface to his German translation of Modena's works published under the title Der Kampf des Rabbiners Gegen den Talmud im XVII. Jahrhundert.
