= Hans Kupelwieser =

- Hans Kupelwieser
- Born: April 8, 1948 (age 78); Lunz am See, Lower Austria, Austria
- Occupations: Sculptor, graphic artist, photographer, media artist, professor

Hans Kupelwieser (born 8 April 1948 in Lunz am See, Lower Austria) is an Austrian sculptor, graphic artist, photographer and media artist.

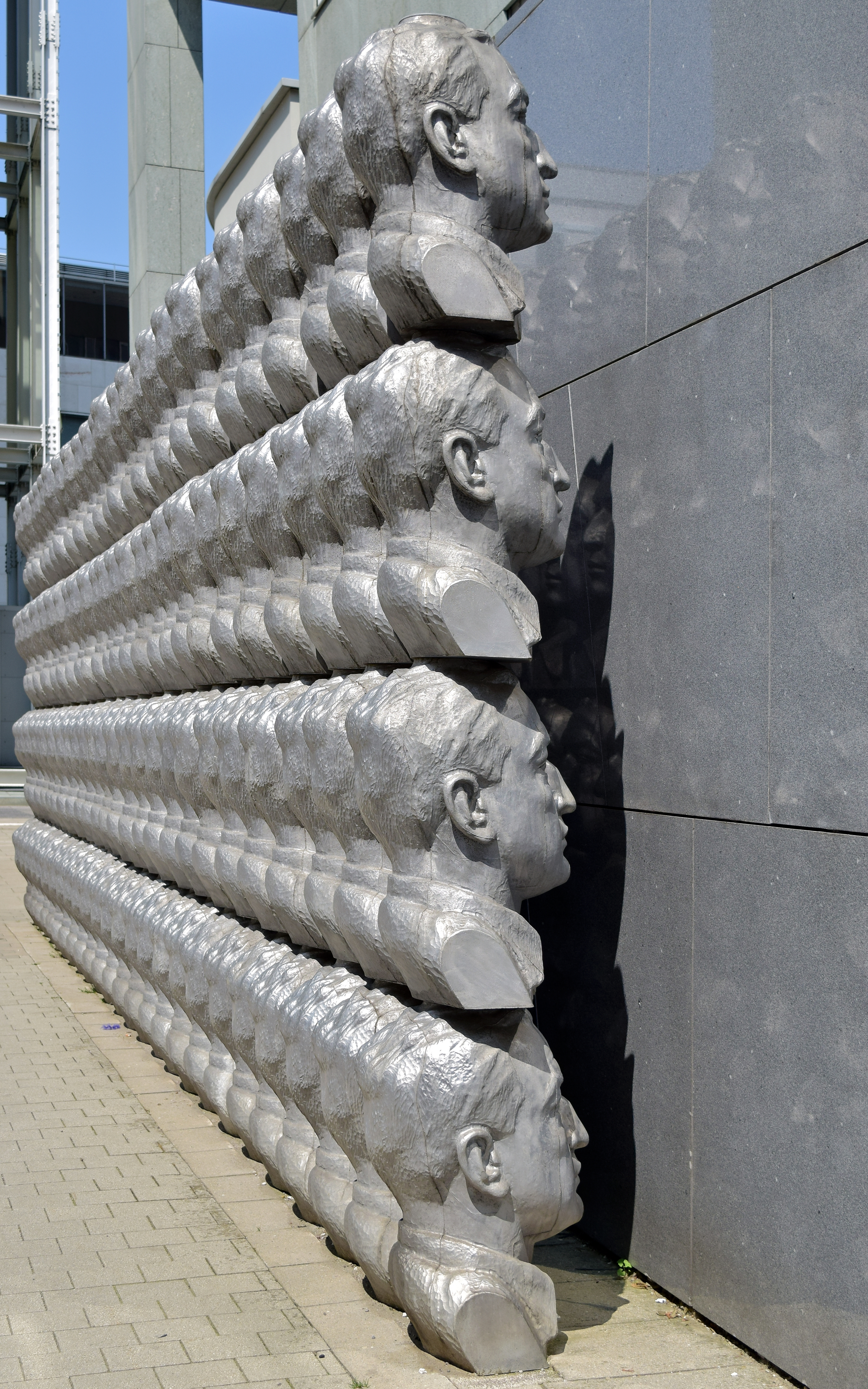
Hohlkopfwand installation in the Landhausviertel, St. Pölten (2000)

== Life and Education ==
Kupelwieser attended the Bundesgymnasium und Bundesrealgymnasium Keimgasse in Mödling, where he graduated in 1968. He has lived and worked in both Graz and Vienna. Since 1995 he has held a professorship at the Institute for Contemporary Art at Graz University of Technology, teaching in the field of Plastic (Sculptural) Design.

From 1970 to 1973, Kupelwieser studied at the Graphische Lehr- und Versuchsanstalt in Vienna; from 1976 to 1982 he studied at the University of Applied Arts Vienna under the mentorship of Bazon Brock, Peter Weibel, and Herbert Tasquil. His sculptural concept developed in those years and later expanded to include multimedia approaches, combining materials, media and shifting functions.

In the early 1990s, he began working with "pneumatic sculptures" called Gonflables, which inflate using air pressure while retaining a framework of aluminum. He also works with photograms, objects integrated into photographic media, furniture-sculptures, installation, and kinetic and media-based forms.

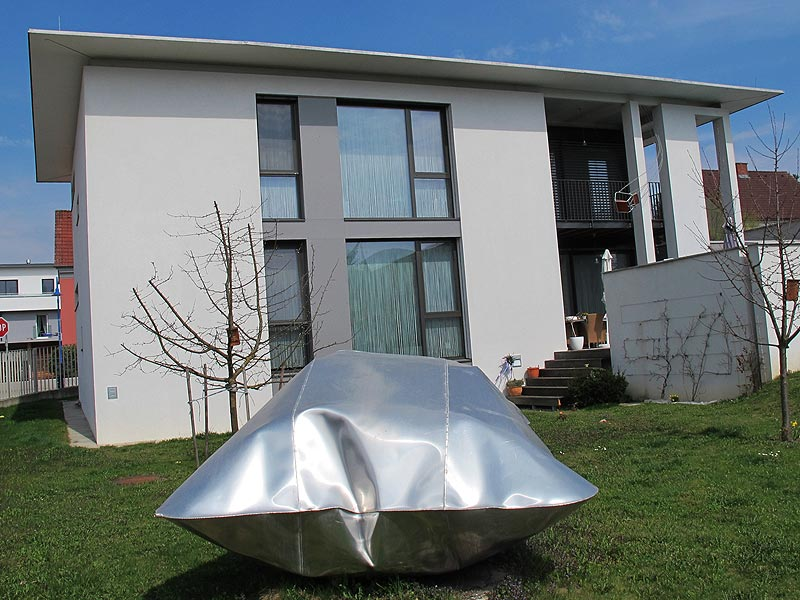
Gonflable sculpture by Hans Kupelwieser, Wolf Collection, Gleisdorf

== Exhibitions and projects ==
Some significant exhibitions and projects include:

- 2004: *Postmediale Skulpturen*, Neue Galerie Graz
- 2013: *Bye-bye, Anopheles* installation at Brioni (Brijuni, Croatia)
- 2020: Solo exhibition at W&K (Wienerroither & Kohlbacher), Vienna, showcasing his multimedia approach and works across sculpture, photography, and media.
- 2022: Commissioned ceiling relief ("Untitled", 2022) for the Tea Room in the Heidi Horten Collection, Vienna.
- 2022 (Jul–Oct): A two-part exhibition at Kunsthalle Krems and Dominikanerkirche Krems, featuring large-format photograms, experimental sculptures, and augmented reality elements.
- In Hellbrunn (Salzburg), he was invited to present sculptures in the Sculpture Park (2021), blending nature, space, and material boundaries.

Notably, in his 2020 W&K exhibition, Kupelwieser's concept of sculpture, which transgressively incorporated notions of media and media-to-object interface, was emphasized. He works in paper, metal, plastic, concrete, rubber, glass, plexiglass, and uses photograms and "gonflables" as key strategies. He also developed a "lake stage" in Lunz, which received the Austrian Building Prize in 2005.

== Artistic profile ==
Kupelwieser's work is often described as operating at the threshold between two-dimensional and three-dimensional forms. His practice emphasizes "interactions of materials, media, and form," often using "guided coincidence" methods where unexpected transformations are part of the creative outcome.

He experiments with photograms—objects directly exposed on photographic paper without camera optics—and interlaces them with sculpture and installation. Kupelwieser's works are included in national and international collections and represented by galleries such as Smolka Contemporary.

== Awards and honors ==
- 1994: Prize of the City of Vienna for Visual Arts
- 2008: Lower Austrian Culture Prize — Media Art (Würdigungspreis)

== Selected works in collections & public space ==
Some of his works are held in public and private collections; for example, Smolka Contemporary lists several recent aluminum and photogram works from 2023 to 2024.

He has created public installations linking architecture and sculpture, such as his 2022 Krems church project, and previously in Hellbrunn and Lunz.
