= Reinsberg =

Reinsberg may refer to:

- Reinsberg, Germany, a municipality in the district of Mittelsachsen, in Saxony, Germany
- Reinsberg, Austria, a municipality in the district of Scheibbs in Lower Austria, Austria
