= Mostviertel (National Council electoral district) =

Parliamentary electoral district in Austria

- Electoral District for the National Council
- Location of Mostviertel within Austria
- District: List: Amstetten; Melk; Scheibbs; Waidhofen an der Ybbs City
- State: Lower Austria
- Population: 250,778 (2024)
- Electorate: 194,417 (2019)
- Area: 3,356 km^{2} (2023)

Current Electoral District
- Created: 1994
- Seats: 6 (1994–present)
- Members: List: Andreas Hanger (ÖVP); Alois Schroll (SPÖ); Georg Strasser (ÖVP)

Mostviertel, also known as Electoral District 3C (German: Wahlkreis 3C), is one of the 39 multi-member regional electoral districts of the National Council, the lower house of the Austrian Parliament, the national legislature of Austria. The electoral district was created in 1992 when electoral regulations were amended to add regional electoral districts to the existing state-wide electoral districts and came into being at the following legislative election in 1994. It consists of the city of Waidhofen an der Ybbs and the districts of Amstetten, Melk and Scheibbs in the state of Lower Austria. The electoral district currently elects six of the 183 members of the National Council using the open party-list proportional representation electoral system. At the 2019 legislative election the constituency had 194,417 registered electors.

== History ==
Mostviertel was one 43 regional electoral districts (regionalwahlkreise) established by the "National Council Electoral Regulations 1992" (Nationalrats-Wahlordnung 1992) passed by the National Council in 1992. It consisted of the city of Waidhofen an der Ybbs and the districts of Amstetten, Melk and Scheibbs in the state of Lower Austria. The district was initially allocated six seats in May 1993.

== Electoral system ==
Mostviertel currently elects six of the 183 members of the National Council using the open party-list proportional representation electoral system. The allocation of seats is carried out in three stages. In the first stage, seats are allocated to parties (lists) at the regional level using a state-wide Hare quota (wahlzahl) (valid votes in the state divided by the number of seats in the state). In the second stage, seats are allocated to parties at the state/provincial level using the state-wide Hare quota (any seats won by the party at the regional stage are subtracted from the party's state seats). In the third and final stage, seats are allocated to parties at the federal/national level using the D'Hondt method (any seats won by the party at the regional and state stages are subtracted from the party's federal seats). Only parties that reach the 4% national threshold, or have won a seat at the regional stage, compete for seats at the state and federal stages.

Electors may cast one preferential vote for individual candidates at the regional, state and federal levels. Split-ticket voting (panachage), or voting for more than one candidate at each level, is not permitted and will result in the ballot paper being invalidated. At the regional level, candidates must receive preferential votes amounting to at least 14% of the valid votes cast for their party to over-ride the order of the party list (10% and 7% respectively for the state and federal levels). Prior to April 2013 electors could not cast preferential votes at the federal level and the thresholds candidates needed to over-ride the party list order were higher at the regional level (half the Hare quota or 1/6 of the party votes) and state level (Hare quota).

== Election results ==
=== Summary ===
Election	Communists KPÖ+ / KPÖ			Social Democrats SPÖ			Greens GRÜNE			NEOS NEOS / LiF			People's ÖVP			Freedom FPÖ		
Election	Votes	%	Seats	Votes	%	Seats	Votes	%	Seats	Votes	%	Seats	Votes	%	Seats	Votes	%	Seats
2019	801	0.51%	0	30,382	19.31%	1	15,786	10.04%	0	10,028	6.38%	0	71,693	45.58%	2	25,571	16.26%	0
2017	790	0.48%	0	39,144	23.75%	1	4,105	2.49%	0	7,175	4.35%	0	63,455	38.50%	2	42,380	25.72%	1
2013	982	0.62%	0	40,660	25.83%	1	14,495	9.21%	0	4,953	3.15%	0	56,252	35.74%	2	27,981	17.78%	1
2008	822	0.51%	0	44,420	27.50%	1	11,112	6.88%	0	1,746	1.08%	0	59,519	36.84%	2	27,485	17.01%	0
2006	1,068	0.68%	0	52,183	33.25%	1	11,807	7.52%	0				70,497	44.92%	2	13,595	8.66%	0
2002	617	0.39%	0	52,046	32.95%	1	9,749	6.17%	0	969	0.61%	0	84,662	53.60%	3	9,895	6.27%	0
1999	439	0.29%	0	46,358	30.98%	1	8,752	5.85%	0	2,785	1.86%	0	57,960	38.73%	2	31,400	20.98%	1
1995	297	0.20%	0	52,533	34.59%	1	6,153	4.05%	0	5,322	3.50%	0	60,317	39.72%	2	25,125	16.54%	0
1994	261	0.18%	0	45,995	31.29%	1	8,777	5.97%	0	5,725	3.89%	0	59,816	40.69%	2	24,392	16.59%	0

=== Detailed ===
==== 2010s ====
===== 2019 =====
Results of the 2019 legislative election held on 29 September 2019:

Party		Votes per district					Total votes	%	Seats
Party		Ams- tetten	Melk	Schei- bbs	Waid- hofen an der Ybbs City	Voting card	Total votes	%	Seats
Austrian People's Party	ÖVP	32,612	22,041	13,648	3,288	104	71,693	45.58%	2
Social Democratic Party of Austria	SPÖ	14,458	10,065	4,564	1,231	64	30,382	19.31%	1
Freedom Party of Austria	FPÖ	11,935	8,727	3,985	880	44	25,571	16.26%	0
The Greens	GRÜNE	7,686	4,320	2,610	1,026	144	15,786	10.04%	0
NEOS	NEOS	4,807	2,885	1,658	592	86	10,028	6.38%	0
JETZT	JETZT	1,044	698	326	158	21	2,247	1.43%	0
KPÖ Plus	KPÖ+	377	250	130	39	5	801	0.51%	0
Der Wandel	WANDL	370	223	160	31	7	791	0.50%	0
Valid Votes		73,289	49,209	27,081	7,245	475	157,299	100.00%	3
Rejected Votes		1,253	930	452	108	10	2,753	1.72%	
Total Polled		74,542	50,139	27,533	7,353	485	160,052	82.32%	
Registered Electors		90,724	61,786	32,997	8,910		194,417		
Turnout		82.16%	81.15%	83.44%	82.53%		82.32%		

The following candidates were elected:

- Party mandates - Andreas Hanger (ÖVP), 413 votes; Alois Schroll (SPÖ), 3,625 votes; and Georg Strasser (ÖVP), 9,885 votes.

===== 2017 =====
Results of the 2017 legislative election held on 15 October 2017:

Party		Votes per district					Total votes	%	Seats
Party		Ams- tetten	Melk	Schei- bbs	Waid- hofen an der Ybbs City	Voting card	Total votes	%	Seats
Austrian People's Party	ÖVP	28,927	19,155	12,078	3,135	160	63,455	38.50%	2
Freedom Party of Austria	FPÖ	19,727	14,098	6,882	1,573	100	42,380	25.72%	1
Social Democratic Party of Austria	SPÖ	18,862	12,514	5,899	1,706	163	39,144	23.75%	1
NEOS	NEOS	3,428	2,064	1,205	403	75	7,175	4.35%	0
Peter Pilz List	PILZ	2,326	1,525	852	322	75	5,100	3.09%	0
The Greens	GRÜNE	1,943	1,129	694	272	67	4,105	2.49%	0
My Vote Counts!	GILT	914	678	370	76	10	2,048	1.24%	0
Communist Party of Austria	KPÖ	379	234	123	35	19	790	0.48%	0
The Whites	WEIßE	193	120	84	22	1	420	0.25%	0
Free List Austria	FLÖ	87	71	26	5	0	189	0.11%	0
Valid Votes		76,786	51,588	28,213	7,549	670	164,806	100.00%	4
Rejected Votes		1,071	754	386	95	5	2,311	1.38%	
Total Polled		77,857	52,342	28,599	7,644	675	167,117	85.93%	
Registered Electors		90,598	61,744	33,146	8,994		194,482		
Turnout		85.94%	84.77%	86.28%	84.99%		85.93%		

The following candidates were elected:

- Personal mandates - Georg Strasser (ÖVP), 12,932 votes.
- Party mandates - Andreas Hanger (ÖVP), 6,455 votes; Ulrike Königsberger-Ludwig (SPÖ), 4,738 votes; and Edith Mühlberghuber (FPÖ), 2,072 votes.

Substitutions:

- Ulrike Königsberger-Ludwig (SPÖ) resigned on 21 March 2018 and was replaced by Renate Gruber (SPÖ) on 22 March 2018.

===== 2013 =====
Results of the 2013 legislative election held on 29 September 2013:

Party		Votes per district					Total votes	%	Seats
Party		Ams- tetten	Melk	Schei- bbs	Waid- hofen an der Ybbs City	Voting card	Total votes	%	Seats
Austrian People's Party	ÖVP	24,692	17,504	11,171	2,774	111	56,252	35.74%	2
Social Democratic Party of Austria	SPÖ	19,202	13,493	6,236	1,646	83	40,660	25.83%	1
Freedom Party of Austria	FPÖ	13,114	9,313	4,415	1,084	55	27,981	17.78%	1
The Greens	GRÜNE	7,127	4,010	2,383	861	114	14,495	9.21%	0
Team Stronach	FRANK	3,140	1,989	1,133	307	12	6,581	4.18%	0
NEOS	NEOS	2,370	1,494	724	323	42	4,953	3.15%	0
Alliance for the Future of Austria	BZÖ	2,112	1,219	767	252	19	4,369	2.78%	0
Pirate Party of Austria	PIRAT	548	352	173	52	1	1,126	0.72%	0
Communist Party of Austria	KPÖ	480	300	155	37	10	982	0.62%	0
Valid Votes		72,785	49,674	27,157	7,336	447	157,399	100.00%	4
Rejected Votes		1,880	1,163	738	165	9	3,955	2.45%	
Total Polled		74,665	50,837	27,895	7,501	456	161,354	83.14%	
Registered Electors		89,952	61,676	33,381	9,073		194,082		
Turnout		83.01%	82.43%	83.57%	82.67%		83.14%		

The following candidates were elected:

- Personal mandates - Georg Strasser (ÖVP), 16,219 votes.
- Party mandates - Andreas Hanger (ÖVP), 6,940 votes; Ulrike Königsberger-Ludwig (SPÖ), 5,665 votes; and Edith Mühlberghuber (FPÖ), 1,948 votes.

==== 2000s ====
===== 2008 =====
Results of the 2008 legislative election held on 28 September 2008:

Party		Votes per district					Total votes	%	Seats
Party		Ams- tetten	Melk	Schei- bbs	Waid- hofen an der Ybbs City	Voting card	Total votes	%	Seats
Austrian People's Party	ÖVP	26,545	18,096	11,650	2,857	371	59,519	36.84%	2
Social Democratic Party of Austria	SPÖ	20,577	14,680	6,927	1,942	294	44,420	27.50%	1
Freedom Party of Austria	FPÖ	12,616	9,324	4,269	1,086	190	27,485	17.01%	0
Alliance for the Future of Austria	BZÖ	5,415	3,282	2,076	638	100	11,511	7.13%	0
The Greens	GRÜNE	5,478	2,910	1,778	661	285	11,112	6.88%	0
Fritz Dinkhauser List – Citizens' Forum Tyrol	FRITZ	1,098	599	376	217	26	2,316	1.43%	0
Liberal Forum	LiF	816	459	296	132	43	1,746	1.08%	0
Independent Citizens' Initiative Save Austria	RETTÖ	609	455	237	49	18	1,368	0.85%	0
The Christians	DC	487	427	206	121	10	1,251	0.77%	0
Communist Party of Austria	KPÖ	376	267	133	32	14	822	0.51%	0
Valid Votes		74,017	50,499	27,948	7,735	1,351	161,550	100.00%	3
Rejected Votes		2,067	1,423	813	226	18	4,547	2.74%	
Total Polled		76,084	51,922	28,761	7,961	1,369	166,097	86.50%	
Registered Electors		88,546	60,953	33,264	9,246		192,009		
Turnout		85.93%	85.18%	86.46%	86.10%		86.50%		

The following candidates were elected:

- Party mandates - Karl Donabauer (ÖVP), 8,389 votes; Ulrike Königsberger-Ludwig (SPÖ), 3,934 votes; and Günter Kößl (ÖVP), 4,895 votes.

===== 2006 =====
Results of the 2006 legislative election held on 1 October 2006:

Party		Votes per district					Total votes	%	Seats
Party		Ams- tetten	Melk	Schei- bbs	Waid- hofen an der Ybbs City	Voting card	Total votes	%	Seats
Austrian People's Party	ÖVP	30,548	20,744	13,442	3,259	2,504	70,497	44.92%	2
Social Democratic Party of Austria	SPÖ	23,447	17,013	7,703	2,126	1,894	52,183	33.25%	1
Freedom Party of Austria	FPÖ	6,380	4,361	1,786	675	393	13,595	8.66%	0
The Greens	GRÜNE	5,151	2,978	1,814	729	1,135	11,807	7.52%	0
Hans-Peter Martin's List	MATIN	1,788	1,261	730	242	151	4,172	2.66%	0
Alliance for the Future of Austria	BZÖ	1,692	1,014	623	177	119	3,625	2.31%	0
Communist Party of Austria	KPÖ	460	310	207	47	44	1,068	0.68%	0
Valid Votes		69,466	47,681	26,305	7,255	6,240	156,947	100.00%	3
Rejected Votes		1,511	1,123	663	168	87	3,552	2.21%	
Total Polled		70,977	48,804	26,968	7,423	6,327	160,499	87.16%	
Registered Electors		84,659	58,522	32,014	8,946		184,141		
Turnout		83.84%	83.39%	84.24%	82.98%		87.16%		

The following candidates were elected:

- Personal mandates - Alfred Gusenbauer (SPÖ), 10,407 votes.
- Party mandates - Karl Donabauer (ÖVP), 9,602 votes; and Günter Kößl (ÖVP), 7,783 votes.

Substitutions:

- Alfred Gusenbauer (SPÖ) resigned on 15 January 2007 and was replaced by Gabriele Binder-Maier (SPÖ).

===== 2002 =====
Results of the 2002 legislative election held on 24 November 2002:

Party		Votes per district					Total votes	%	Seats
Party		Ams- tetten	Melk	Schei- bbs	Waid- hofen an der Ybbs City	Voting card	Total votes	%	Seats
Austrian People's Party	ÖVP	37,055	25,201	15,829	4,014	2,563	84,662	53.60%	3
Social Democratic Party of Austria	SPÖ	23,767	16,860	7,619	2,383	1,417	52,046	32.95%	1
Freedom Party of Austria	FPÖ	4,361	3,243	1,582	448	261	9,895	6.27%	0
The Greens	GRÜNE	4,296	2,434	1,505	553	961	9,749	6.17%	0
Liberal Forum	LiF	405	313	142	63	46	969	0.61%	0
Communist Party of Austria	KPÖ	261	183	104	50	19	617	0.39%	0
Valid Votes		70,145	48,234	26,781	7,511	5,267	157,938	100.00%	4
Rejected Votes		1,093	835	433	108	42	2,511	1.56%	
Total Polled		71,238	49,069	27,214	7,619	5,309	160,449	90.59%	
Registered Electors		81,165	56,351	30,876	8,729		177,121		
Turnout		87.77%	87.08%	88.14%	87.28%		90.59%		

The following candidates were elected:

- Party mandates - Gabriele Binder (SPÖ), 2,217 votes; Karl Donabauer (ÖVP), 7,780 votes; Günther Hütl (ÖVP), 2,128 votes; and Günter Kößl (ÖVP), 4,550 votes.

==== 1990s ====
===== 1999 =====
Results of the 1999 legislative election held on 3 October 1999:

Party		Votes per district					Total votes	%	Seats
Party		Ams- tetten	Melk	Schei- bbs	Waid- hofen an der Ybbs City	Voting card	Total votes	%	Seats
Austrian People's Party	ÖVP	25,056	17,193	11,042	2,778	1,891	57,960	38.73%	2
Social Democratic Party of Austria	SPÖ	20,978	14,739	7,034	2,122	1,485	46,358	30.98%	1
Freedom Party of Austria	FPÖ	14,041	10,043	4,992	1,305	1,019	31,400	20.98%	1
The Greens	GRÜNE	4,055	2,258	1,303	569	567	8,752	5.85%	0
Liberal Forum	LiF	1,137	718	421	167	342	2,785	1.86%	0
The Independents	DU	469	432	172	64	49	1,186	0.79%	0
No to NATO and EU – Neutral Austria Citizens' Initiative	NEIN	277	267	171	40	16	771	0.52%	0
Communist Party of Austria	KPÖ	176	133	66	45	19	439	0.29%	0
Valid Votes		66,189	45,783	25,201	7,090	5,388	149,651	100.00%	4
Rejected Votes		1,289	1,071	514	157	43	3,074	2.01%	
Total Polled		67,478	46,854	25,715	7,247	5,431	152,725	87.47%	
Registered Electors		79,811	55,635	30,413	8,748		174,607		
Turnout		84.55%	84.22%	84.55%	82.84%		87.47%		

The following candidates were elected:

- Party mandates - Karl Donabauer (ÖVP), 6,018 votes; Günter Kiermaier (SPÖ), 1,849 votes; Günter Kößl (ÖVP), 3,411 votes; and Anton Wattaul (FPÖ), 1,974 votes.

===== 1995 =====
Results of the 1995 legislative election held on 17 December 1995:

Party		Votes per district					Total votes	%	Seats
Party		Ams- tetten	Melk	Schei- bbs	Waid- hofen an der Ybbs City	Voting card	Total votes	%	Seats
Austrian People's Party	ÖVP	26,153	18,077	11,676	2,910	1,501	60,317	39.72%	2
Social Democratic Party of Austria	SPÖ	24,318	16,797	7,819	2,465	1,134	52,533	34.59%	1
Freedom Party of Austria	FPÖ	11,205	8,059	4,158	1,172	531	25,125	16.54%	0
The Greens	GRÜNE	2,956	1,463	857	340	537	6,153	4.05%	0
Liberal Forum	LiF	2,304	1,444	834	321	419	5,322	3.50%	0
No – Civic Action Group; Against the Sale of Austria	NEIN	814	735	424	97	45	2,115	1.39%	0
Communist Party of Austria	KPÖ	122	100	31	34	10	297	0.20%	0
Valid Votes		67,872	46,675	25,799	7,339	4,177	151,862	100.00%	3
Rejected Votes		1,637	1,302	665	183	31	3,818	2.45%	
Total Polled		69,509	47,977	26,464	7,522	4,208	155,680	90.79%	
Registered Electors		78,190	54,882	29,808	8,591		171,471		
Turnout		88.90%	87.42%	88.78%	87.56%		90.79%		

The following candidates were elected:

- Party mandates - Karl Donabauer (ÖVP), 3,516 votes; Günter Kiermaier (SPÖ), 2,463 votes; and Josef Schrefel (ÖVP), 1,221 votes.

===== 1994 =====
Results of the 1994 legislative election held on 9 October 1994:

Party		Votes per district					Total votes	%	Seats
Party		Ams- tetten	Melk	Schei- bbs	Waid- hofen an der Ybbs City	Voting card	Total votes	%	Seats
Austrian People's Party	ÖVP	26,023	17,856	11,615	2,810	1,512	59,816	40.69%	2
Social Democratic Party of Austria	SPÖ	20,822	14,986	6,911	2,180	1,096	45,995	31.29%	1
Freedom Party of Austria	FPÖ	10,797	7,854	3,853	1,149	739	24,392	16.59%	0
The Greens	GRÜNE	4,294	2,090	1,243	518	632	8,777	5.97%	0
Liberal Forum	LiF	2,581	1,472	910	351	411	5,725	3.89%	0
No – Civic Action Group; Against the Sale of Austria	NEIN	669	654	343	94	44	1,804	1.23%	0
Communist Party of Austria	KPÖ	120	85	29	22	5	261	0.18%	0
United Greens Austria – List Adi Pinter	VGÖ	75	40	23	9	1	148	0.10%	0
Citizen Greens Austria – Free Democrats	BGÖ	48	33	10	6	2	99	0.07%	0
Valid Votes		65,429	45,070	24,937	7,139	4,442	147,017	100.00%	3
Rejected Votes		1,614	1,323	618	163	52	3,770	2.50%	
Total Polled		67,043	46,393	25,555	7,302	4,494	150,787	87.96%	
Registered Electors		78,150	54,894	29,740	8,644		171,428		
Turnout		85.79%	84.51%	85.93%	84.47%		87.96%		

The following candidates were elected:

- Party mandates - Karl Donabauer (ÖVP), 6,297 votes; Günter Kiermaier (SPÖ), 2,937 votes; and Josef Schrefel (ÖVP), 2,483 votes.
