= Puchenstuben =

- Municipality
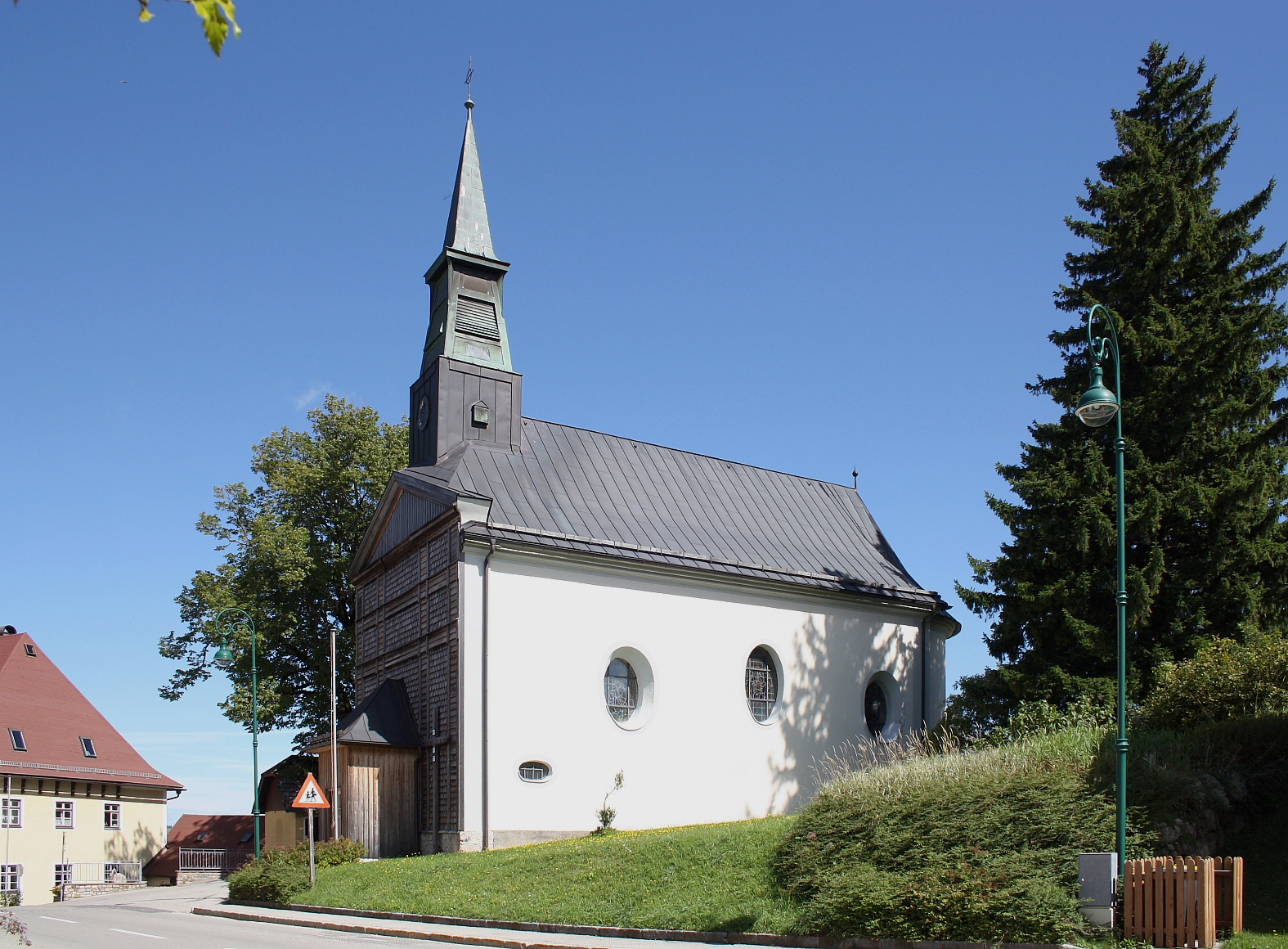
- Puchenstuben parish church

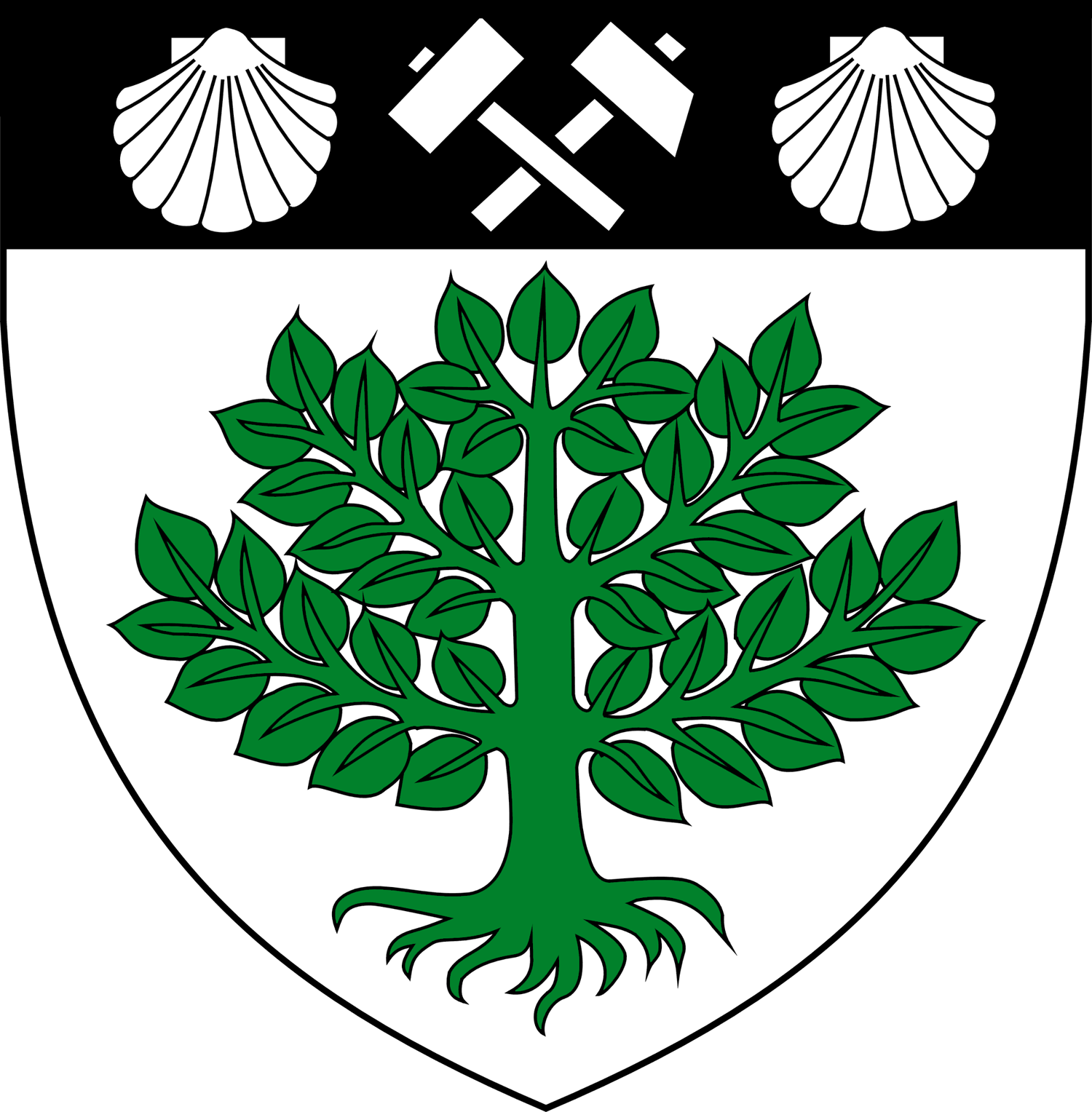
- Coat of arms

- Location within Austria
- Coordinates: 47°56′00″N 15°17′00″E
- Country: Austria
- State: Lower Austria
- District: Scheibbs

Government
  - Mayor: Helmut Emsenhuber (ÖVP)

Area
  - Total: 41.27 km^{2} (15.93 sq mi)
- Elevation: 868 m (2,848 ft)

Population (2018-01-01)
  - Total: 311
  - Density: 7.54/km^{2} (19.5/sq mi)
- Time zone: UTC+1 (CET)
  - Summer (DST): UTC+2 (CEST)
- Postal code: 3214
- Area code: 02726
- Vehicle registration: SB

Puchenstuben is a municipality in the district of Scheibbs in the Austrian state of Lower Austria.

== Population ==
Historical population
Year	Pop.	±%
1971	505	—
1981	418	−17.2%
1991	366	−12.4%
2001	303	−17.2%
2019	300	−1.0%
