= Alois Schroll =

Austrian politician (born 1968)

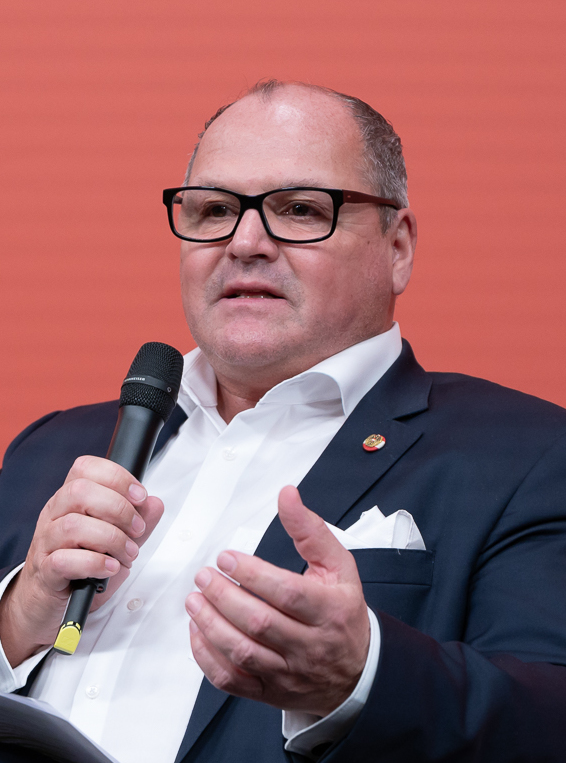
- Schroll in 2022

Member of the National Council
- Incumbent
- Assumed office 23 October 2019
- Constituency: Mostviertel

Personal details
- Born: 13 March 1968 (age 58)
- Party: Social Democratic Party

Alois Schroll (born 13 March 1968) is an Austrian politician of the Social Democratic Party serving as a member of the National Council since 2019. From 2014 to 2021, he served as mayor of Ybbs an der Donau.
