= Meir Randegger =

Jewish-Austrian educationist (1780–1853)

Meir Randegger (February 9, 1780 – March 12, 1853) was a Jewish-Austrian educationist born at Randegg. He was educated at home, at Lengau (Switzerland), at Fürth (Bavaria), and at Presburg, after which he accepted a position as instructor in Vienna. Later he removed to Triest, where he opened a private school. He passed the remainder of his life at Triest, except the period 1838-1847 spent in teaching at Fiume and Fiorenzuola. In 1832 and again in 1834 he acted as rabbi during temporary vacancies occasioned by the deaths of two incumbents.

Randegger maintained a correspondence with the leading rabbis and scholars of his time. Among his works may be mentioned Ẓinnat Dawid (Vienna, 1841) and Haggadah (ib. 1851), with an Italian translation by his daughter and annotations by himself.

== Jewish Encyclopedia bibliography ==
- Schott, in Allg. Zeit. des Jud. 1853, p. 333.
