= Georg Strasser (politician) =

Austrian politician (born 1971)

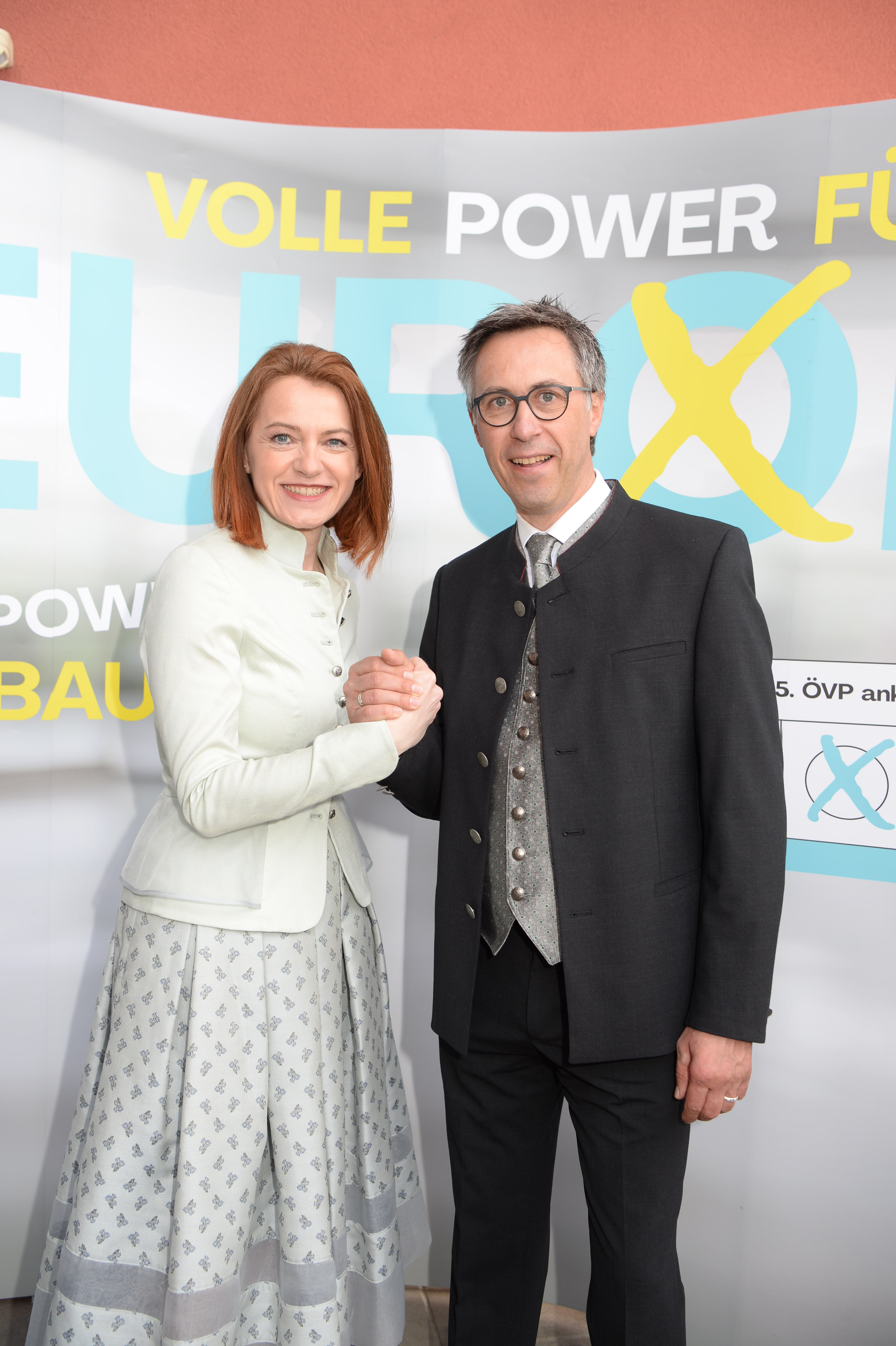
- Strasser in 2019

Member of the National Council
- Incumbent
- Assumed office 29 October 2013
- Constituency: Mostviertel

Personal details
- Born: 29 June 1971 (age 54)
- Party: People's Party

Georg Strasser (born 29 June 1971) is an Austrian politician of the People's Party serving as a member of the National Council since 2013. From 2009 to 2017, he served as mayor of Nöchling.
