= St. Georgen an der Leys =

St. Georgen an der Leys Sankt Geoang
- Municipality
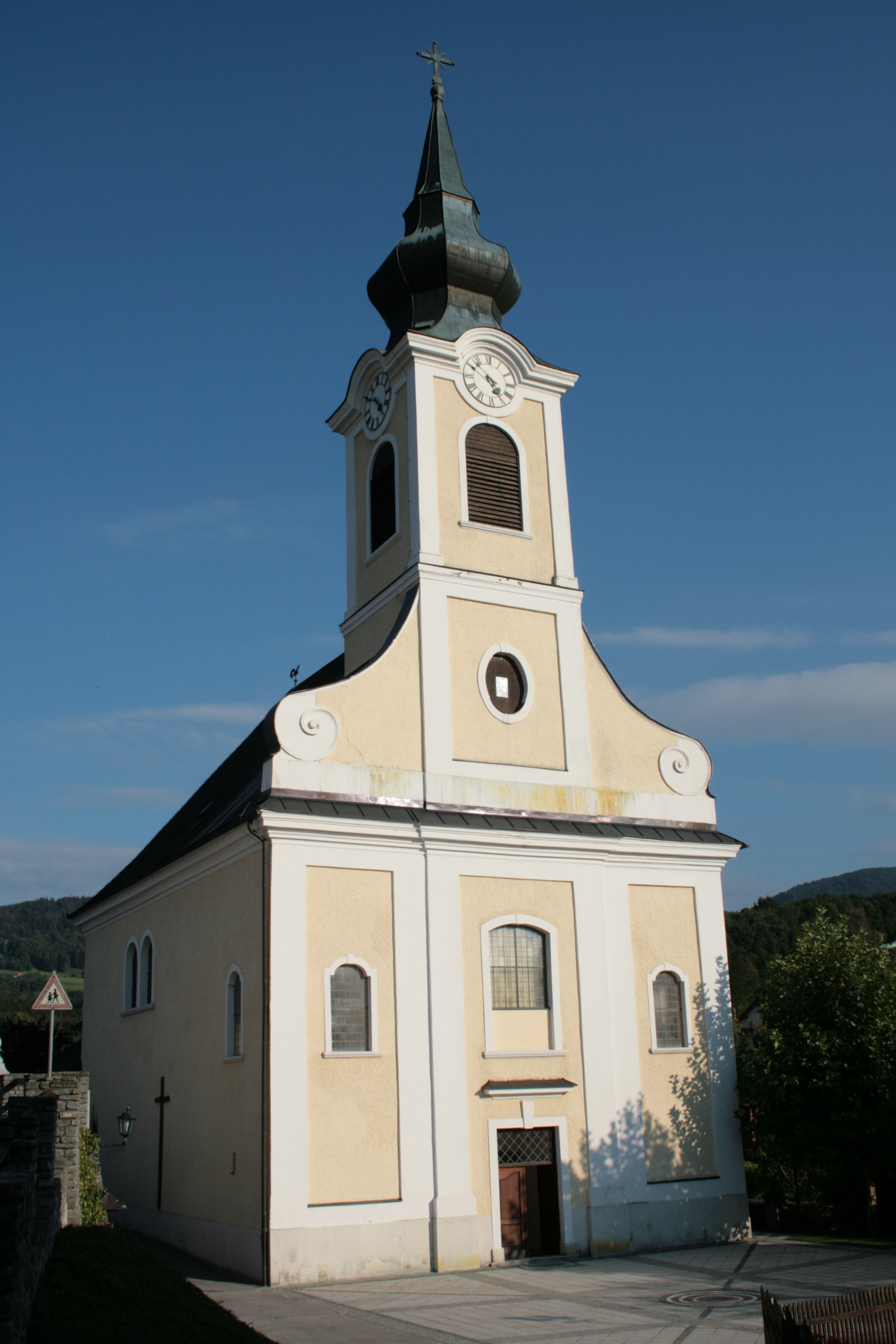
- Sankt Georgen an der Leys parish church

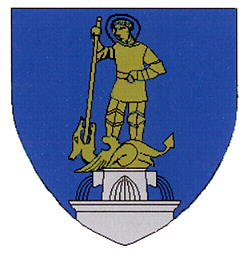
- Coat of arms

- Location within Austria
- Coordinates: 48°02′00″N 15°13′40″E
- Country: Austria
- State: Lower Austria
- District: Scheibbs

Government
  - Mayor: Stefan Schuster (ÖVP)

Area
  - Total: 23.9 km^{2} (9.2 sq mi)
- Elevation: 377 m (1,237 ft)

Population (2016-01-01)
  - Total: 1,334
  - Density: 55.8/km^{2} (145/sq mi)
- Time zone: UTC+1 (CET)
  - Summer (DST): UTC+2 (CEST)
- Postal code: 3282
- Area code: 07482
- Vehicle registration: SB
- Website: www.stgeorgenleys.at

Sankt Georgen an der Leys (Central Bavarian: Sankt Geoang) is a municipality in the district of Scheibbs in Lower Austria, in northeast Austria.

== Population ==
Historical population
Year	Pop.	±%
1971	1,036	—
1981	1,109	+7.0%
1991	1,241	+11.9%
2001	1,299	+4.7%
2013	1,332	+2.5%
