= Edith Mühlberghuber =

Austrian politician (born 1964)

Member of the National Council
- Incumbent
- Assumed office 28 October 2008
- Constituency: 3C Mostviertel

Personal details
- Born: 22 October 1964 (age 61)
- Party: Freedom Party of Austria

Edith Mühlberghuber (born 22 October 1964) is an Austrian politician who has been a Member of the National Council for the Freedom Party of Austria (FPÖ) since 2008.
