= Gresten-Land =

- Municipality
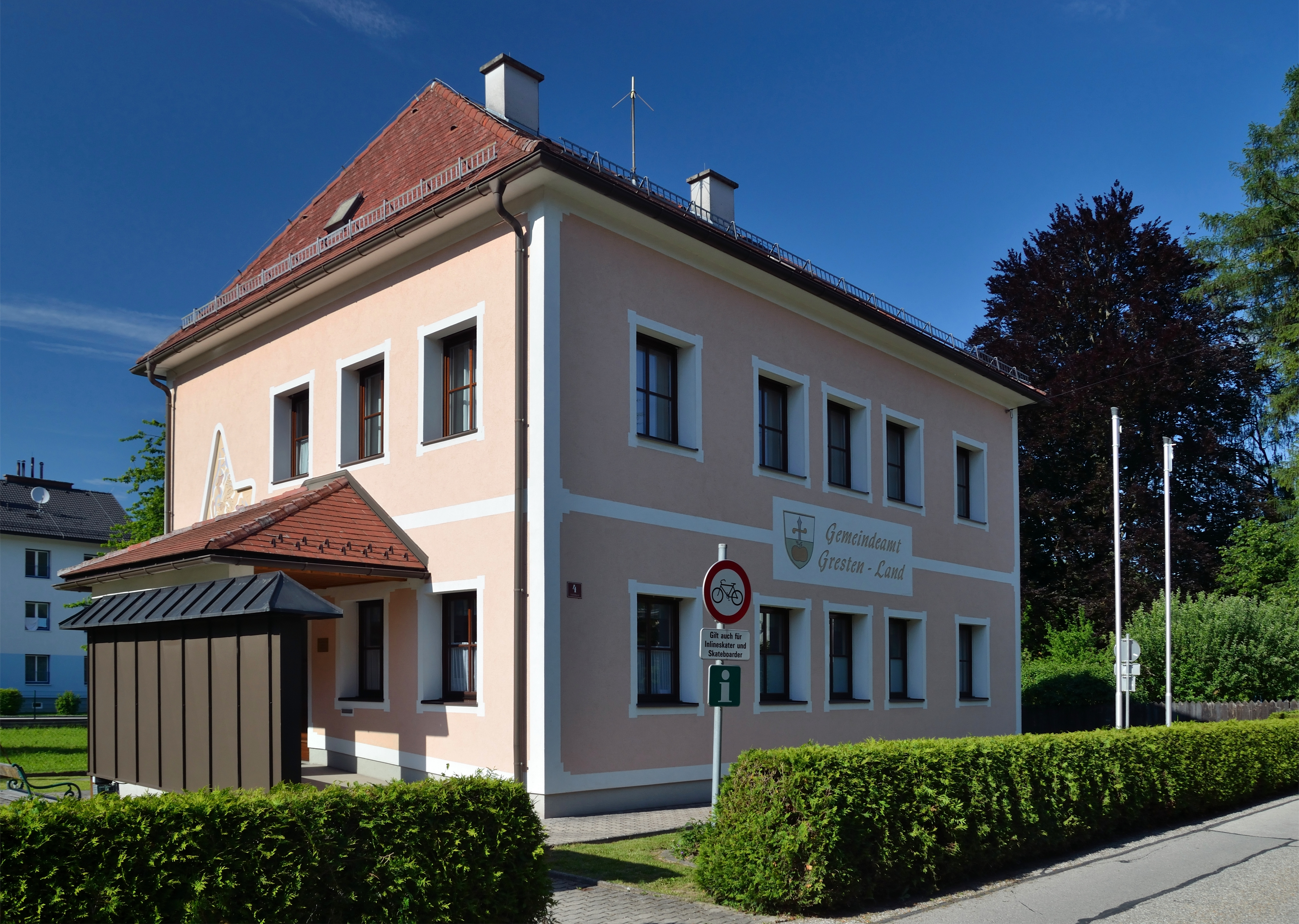
- Gresten-Land town hall

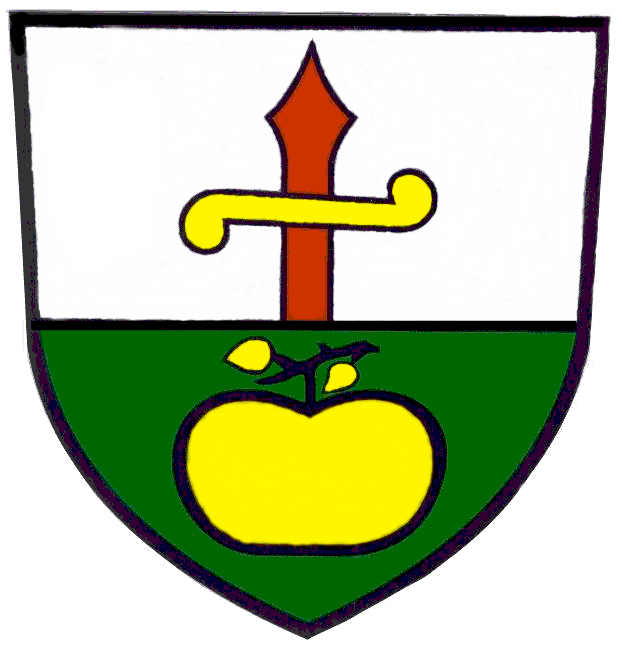
- Coat of arms

- Location within Austria
- Coordinates: 47°59′00″N 15°01′00″E
- Country: Austria
- State: Lower Austria
- District: Scheibbs

Government
  - Mayor: Leopold Latschbacher (ÖVP)

Area
  - Total: 55.49 km^{2} (21.42 sq mi)
- Elevation: 500 m (1,600 ft)

Population (2018-01-01)
  - Total: 1,521
  - Density: 27.41/km^{2} (70.99/sq mi)
- Time zone: UTC+1 (CET)
  - Summer (DST): UTC+2 (CEST)
- Postal code: 3264
- Area code: 07487
- Vehicle registration: SB
- Website: www.gresten-land.at

Gresten-Land is a municipality in the district of Scheibbs in the Austrian state of Lower Austria.

== Population ==
Historical population
Year	Pop.	±%
1971	1,504	—
1981	1,486	−1.2%
1991	1,553	+4.5%
2001	1,544	−0.6%
2011	1,543	−0.1%
