= Steinakirchen am Forst =

- Municipality
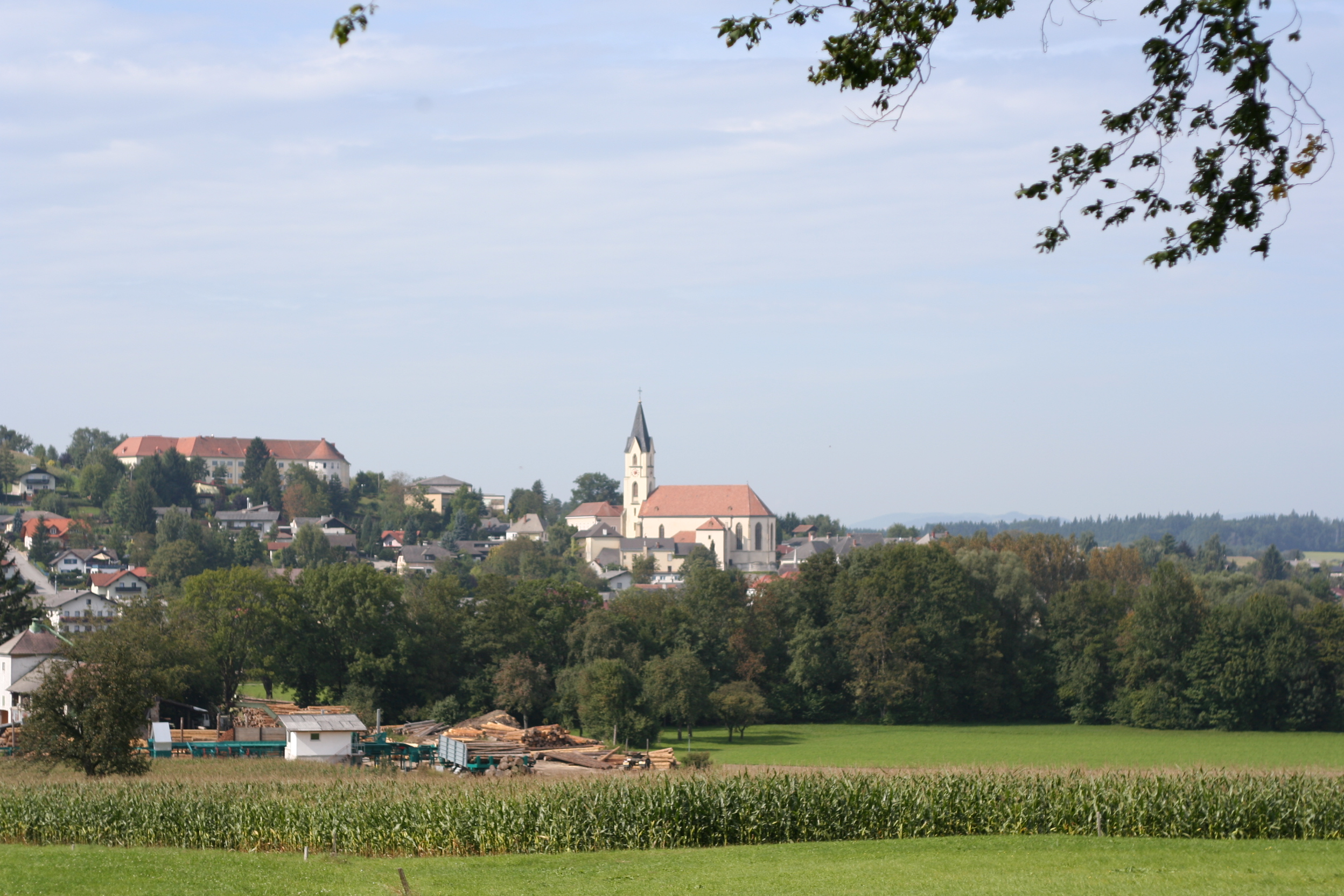

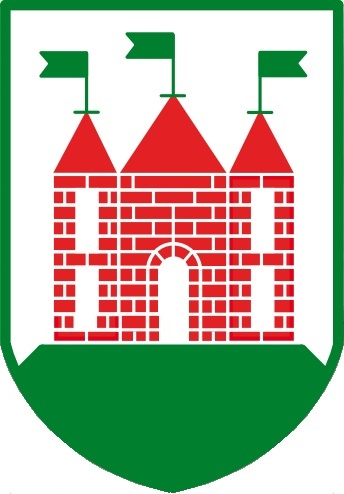
- Coat of arms

- Location within Austria
- Coordinates: 48°04′00″N 15°02′50″E
- Country: Austria
- State: Lower Austria
- District: Scheibbs

Government
  - Mayor: Johann Schagerl (ÖVP)

Area
  - Total: 34.94 km^{2} (13.49 sq mi)
- Elevation: 324 m (1,063 ft)

Population (2018-01-01)
  - Total: 2,274
  - Density: 65.08/km^{2} (168.6/sq mi)
- Time zone: UTC+1 (CET)
  - Summer (DST): UTC+2 (CEST)
- Postal code: 3261
- Area code: 07488
- Vehicle registration: SB

Steinakirchen am Forst is a municipality in the district of Scheibbs in the Austrian state of Lower Austria.

== Population ==
Historical population
Year	Pop.	±%
1971	2,091	—
1981	2,119	+1.3%
1991	2,319	+9.4%
2001	2,370	+2.2%
