= Wolfpassing =

- Municipality
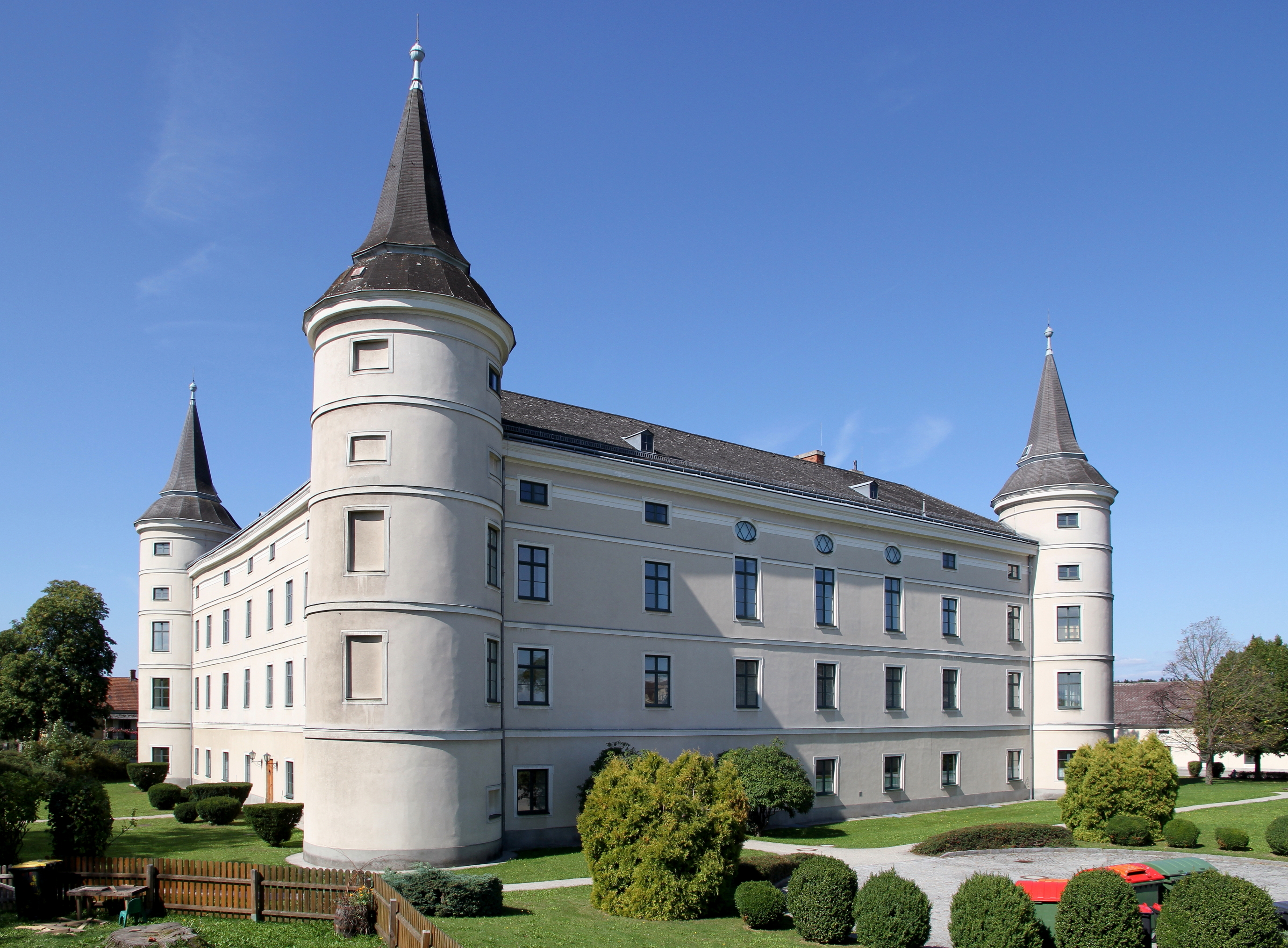

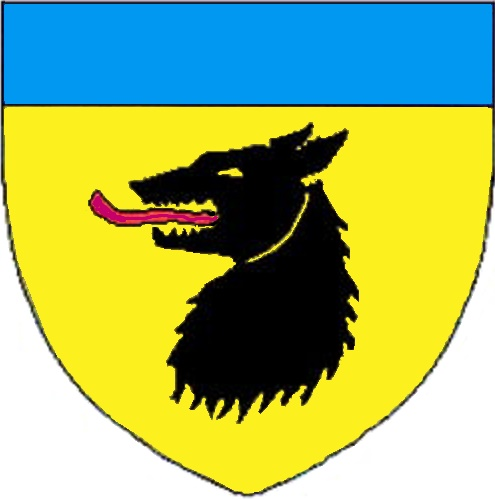
- Coat of arms

- Location within Austria
- Coordinates: 48°04′40″N 15°03′50″E
- Country: Austria
- State: Lower Austria
- District: Scheibbs

Government
  - Mayor: Josef Sonnleitner (ÖVP)

Area
  - Total: 20.34 km^{2} (7.85 sq mi)
- Elevation: 296 m (971 ft)

Population (2018-01-01)
  - Total: 1,616
  - Density: 79.45/km^{2} (205.8/sq mi)
- Time zone: UTC+1 (CET)
  - Summer (DST): UTC+2 (CEST)
- Postal code: 3261
- Area code: 07488
- Vehicle registration: SB
- Website: www.wolfpassing.gv.at

Wolfpassing is a municipality in the district of Scheibbs in the Austrian state of Lower Austria.

== Population ==
Historical population
Year	Pop.	±%
1971	1,208	—
1981	1,268	+5.0%
1991	1,321	+4.2%
2001	1,301	−1.5%
