= Wieselburg-Land =

- Municipality
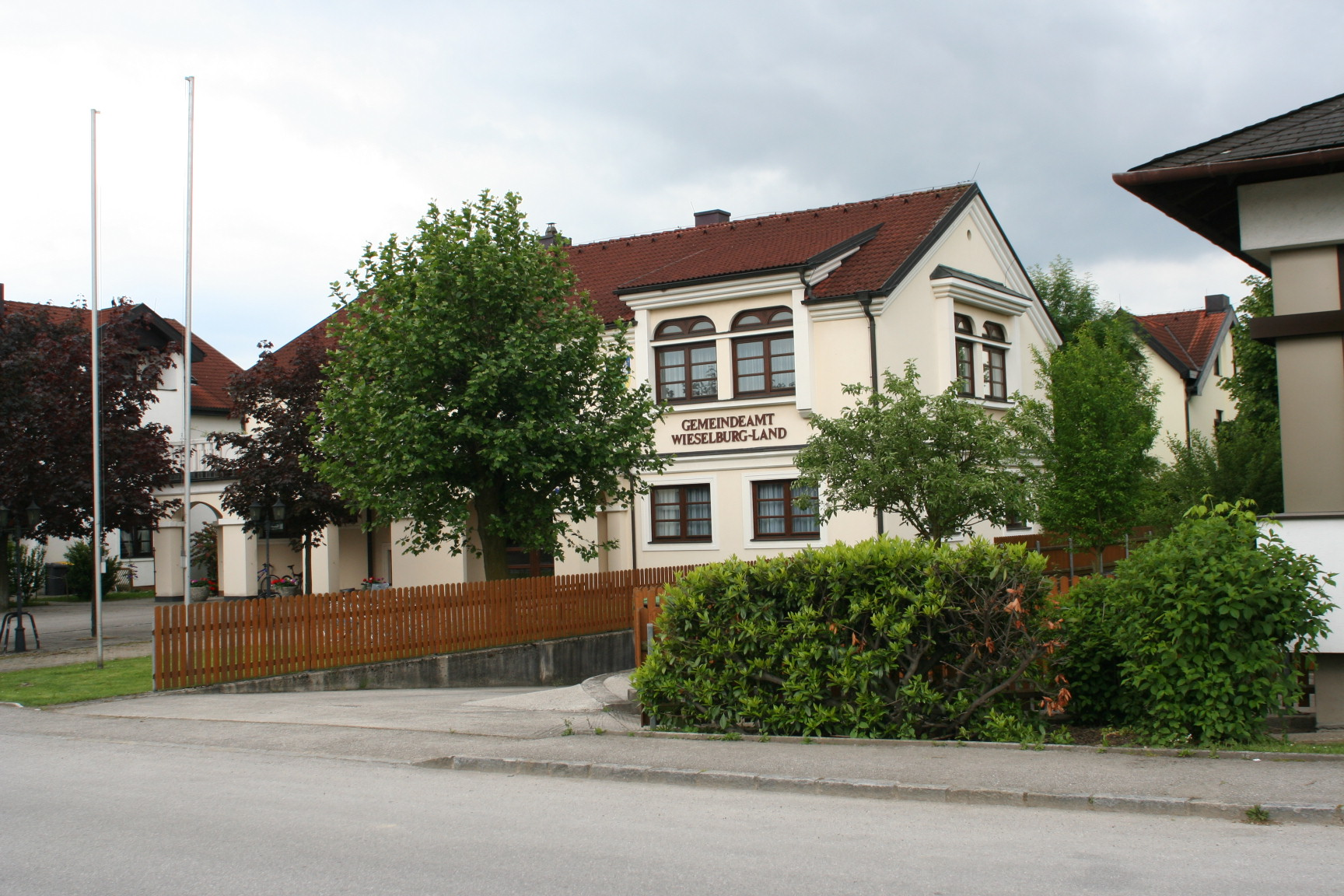
- Town hall

- Coat of arms

- Location within Austria
- Coordinates: 48°07′33″N 15°07′36″E
- Country: Austria
- State: Lower Austria
- District: Scheibbs

Government
  - Mayor: Franz Rafetzeder (ÖVP)

Area
  - Total: 33.96 km^{2} (13.11 sq mi)
- Elevation: 264 m (866 ft)

Population (2018-01-01)
  - Total: 3,311
  - Density: 97.50/km^{2} (252.5/sq mi)
- Time zone: UTC+1 (CET)
  - Summer (DST): UTC+2 (CEST)
- Postal code: 3250
- Area code: 07416
- Vehicle registration: SB
- Website: www.wieselburg-land.at

Wieselburg-Land is a municipality in the district of Scheibbs in the Austrian state of Lower Austria.

== Population ==
Historical population
Year	Pop.	±%
1971	2,554	—
1981	2,775	+8.7%
1991	2,909	+4.8%
2001	3,014	+3.6%
2009	3,202	+6.2%
