= Andreas Hanger =

Austrian politician (born 1968)

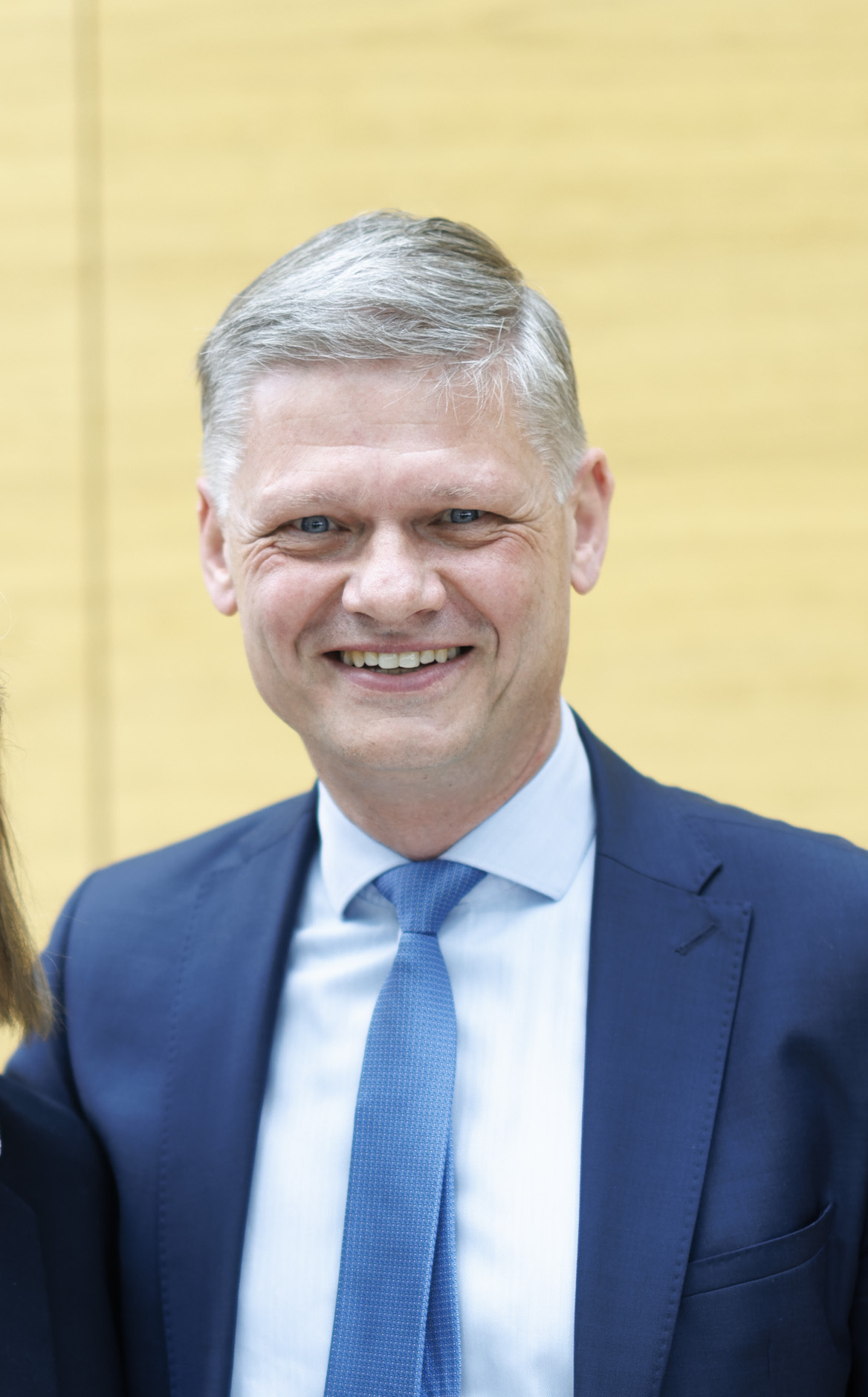
- Hanger in 2024

Member of the National Council
- Incumbent
- Assumed office 29 October 2013
- Constituency: Mostviertel

Personal details
- Born: 19 June 1968 (age 57)
- Party: People's Party

Andreas Hanger (born 19 June 1968) is an Austrian politician of the People's Party. He has been a member of the National Council since 2013, and has served as leader of the People's Party in the Amstetten District since 2015.

In February 2026, Hanger was criticized for attempting to intimidate a witness.
