= Oberndorf an der Melk =

- Municipality
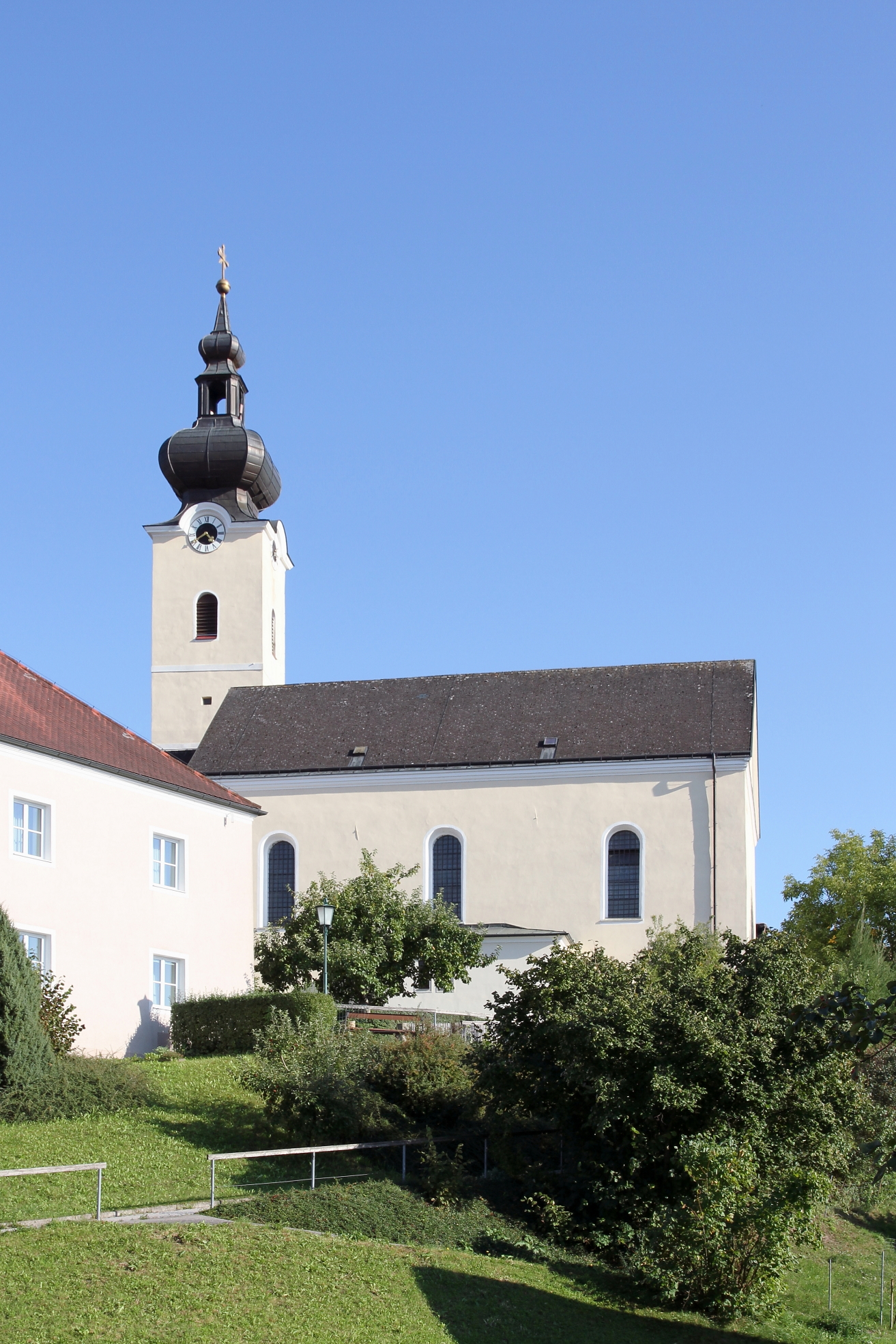
- Oberndorf an der Melk parish church

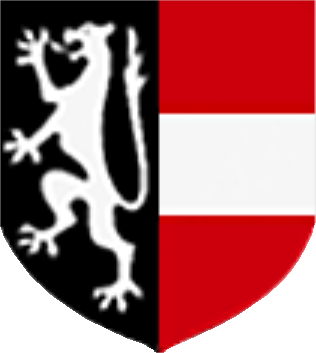
- Coat of arms

- Location within Austria
- Coordinates: 48°03′50″N 15°13′07″E
- Country: Austria
- State: Lower Austria
- District: Scheibbs

Government
  - Mayor: Seiberl Walter (ÖVP)

Area
  - Total: 42.84 km^{2} (16.54 sq mi)
- Elevation: 302 m (991 ft)

Population (2018-01-01)
  - Total: 2,957
  - Density: 69.02/km^{2} (178.8/sq mi)
- Time zone: UTC+1 (CET)
  - Summer (DST): UTC+2 (CEST)
- Postal code: 3281
- Area code: 07483
- Vehicle registration: SB
- Website: www.oberndorf-noe.at

Oberndorf an der Melk is a municipality in the district of Scheibbs in the Austrian state of Lower Austria.

== Population ==
Historical population
Year	Pop.	±%
1971	2,750	—
1981	2,811	+2.2%
1991	2,953	+5.1%
2001	2,937	−0.5%
