= Wang, Austria =

Wang
- Municipality
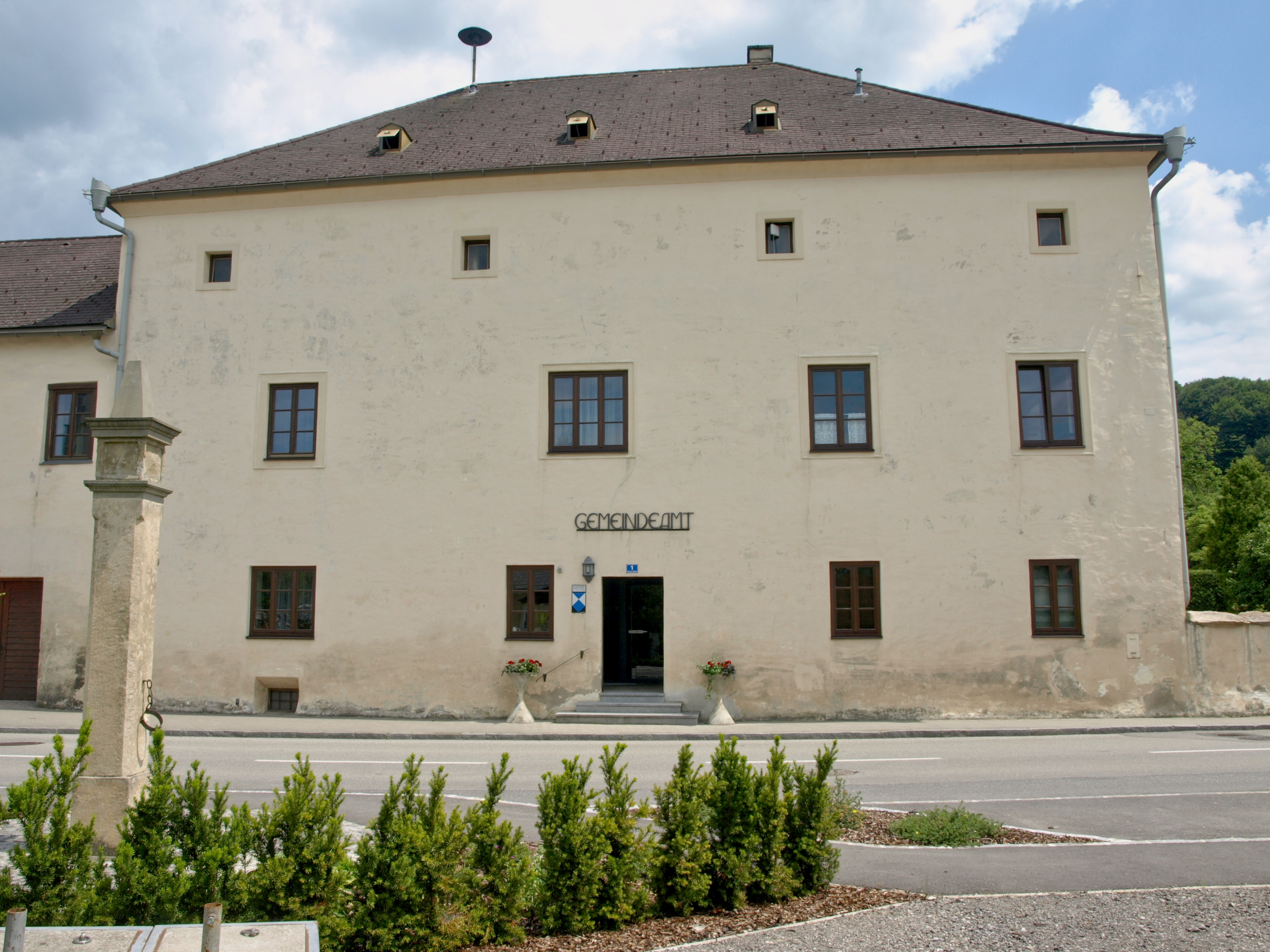
- Municipal office

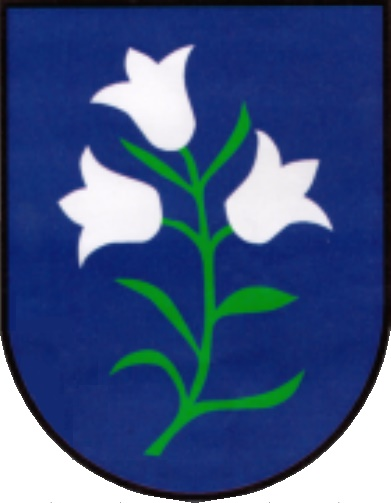
- Coat of arms

- Location within Austria
- Coordinates: 48°02′40″N 15°01′30″E
- Country: Austria
- State: Lower Austria
- District: Scheibbs

Government
  - Mayor: Franz Sonnleitner (ÖVP)

Area
  - Total: 19.67 km^{2} (7.59 sq mi)
- Elevation: 323 m (1,060 ft)

Population (2018-01-01)
  - Total: 1,355
  - Density: 68.89/km^{2} (178.4/sq mi)
- Time zone: UTC+1 (CET)
  - Summer (DST): UTC+2 (CEST)
- Postal code: 3261
- Area code: 07488
- Vehicle registration: SB
- Website: www.wang.at

Wang is a municipality in the district of Scheibbs in the Austrian state of Lower Austria.

== Population ==
Historical population
Year	Pop.	±%
1869	926	—
1880	938	+1.3%
1890	921	−1.8%
1900	932	+1.2%
1910	952	+2.1%
1923	929	−2.4%
1934	969	+4.3%
1939	1,018	+5.1%
1951	990	−2.8%
1961	959	−3.1%
1971	1,041	+8.6%
1981	1,110	+6.6%
1991	1,171	+5.5%
2001	1,283	+9.6%
2011	1,345	+4.8%
