= St. Anton an der Jeßnitz =

- Municipality
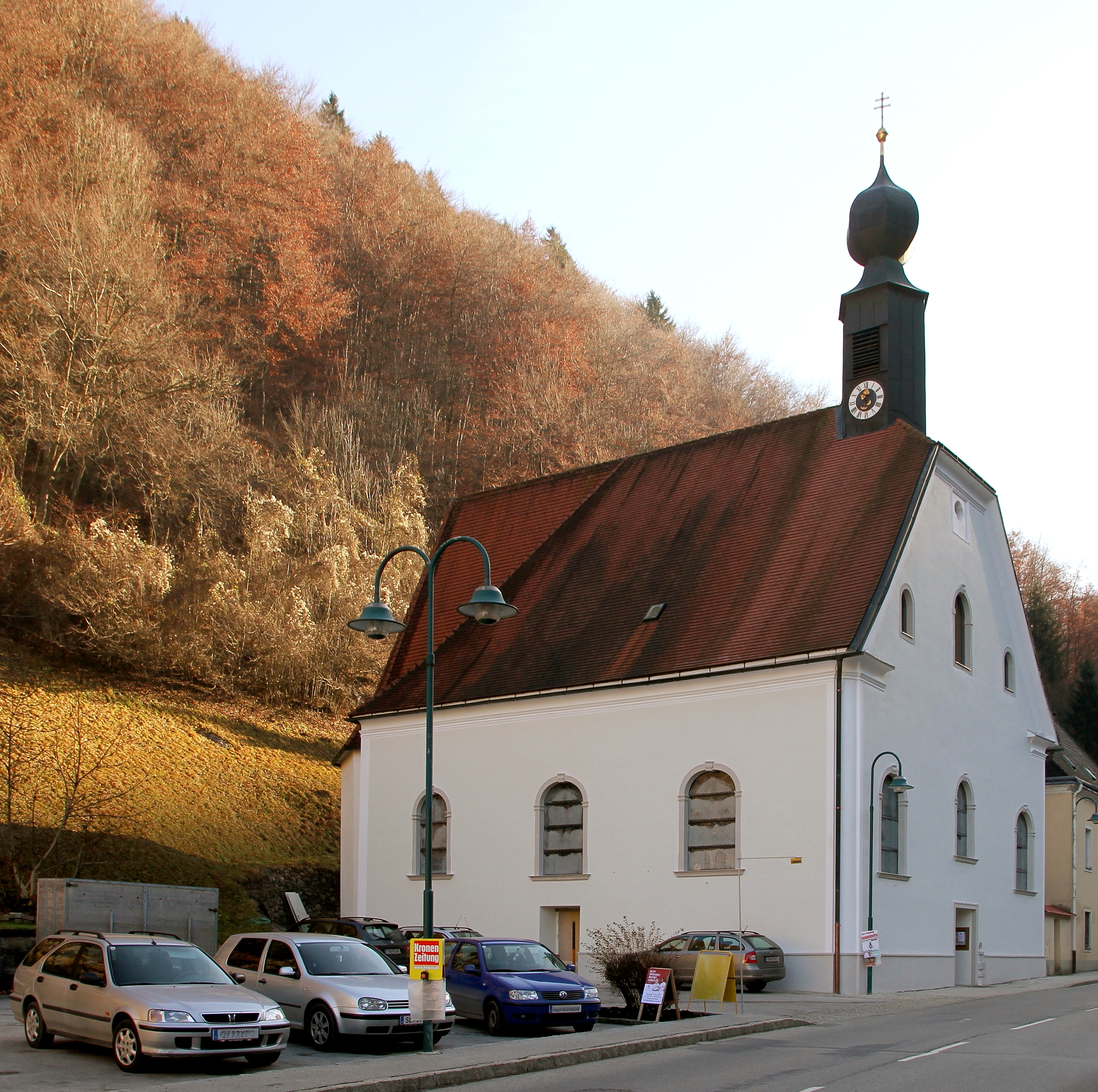
- Sankt Anton an der Jeßnitz parish church

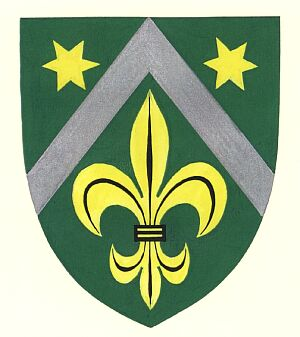
- Coat of arms

- Location within Austria
- Coordinates: 47°57′40″N 15°12′20″E
- Country: Austria
- State: Lower Austria
- District: Scheibbs

Government
  - Mayor: Waltraud Stöckl (ÖVP)

Area
  - Total: 69.69 km^{2} (26.91 sq mi)
- Elevation: 400 m (1,300 ft)

Population (2018-01-01)
  - Total: 1,211
  - Density: 17.38/km^{2} (45.01/sq mi)
- Time zone: UTC+1 (CET)
  - Summer (DST): UTC+2 (CEST)
- Postal code: 3283
- Area code: 07482
- Vehicle registration: SB
- Website: https://www.st-anton-jessnitz.gv.at/willkommen

Sankt Anton an der Jeßnitz is a municipality in the district of Scheibbs in Lower Austria, in northeast Austria.

== Population ==
Historical population
Year	Pop.	±%
1971	1,299	—
1981	1,287	−0.9%
1991	1,273	−1.1%
2001	1,287	+1.1%
