= Purgstall an der Erlauf =

- Municipality
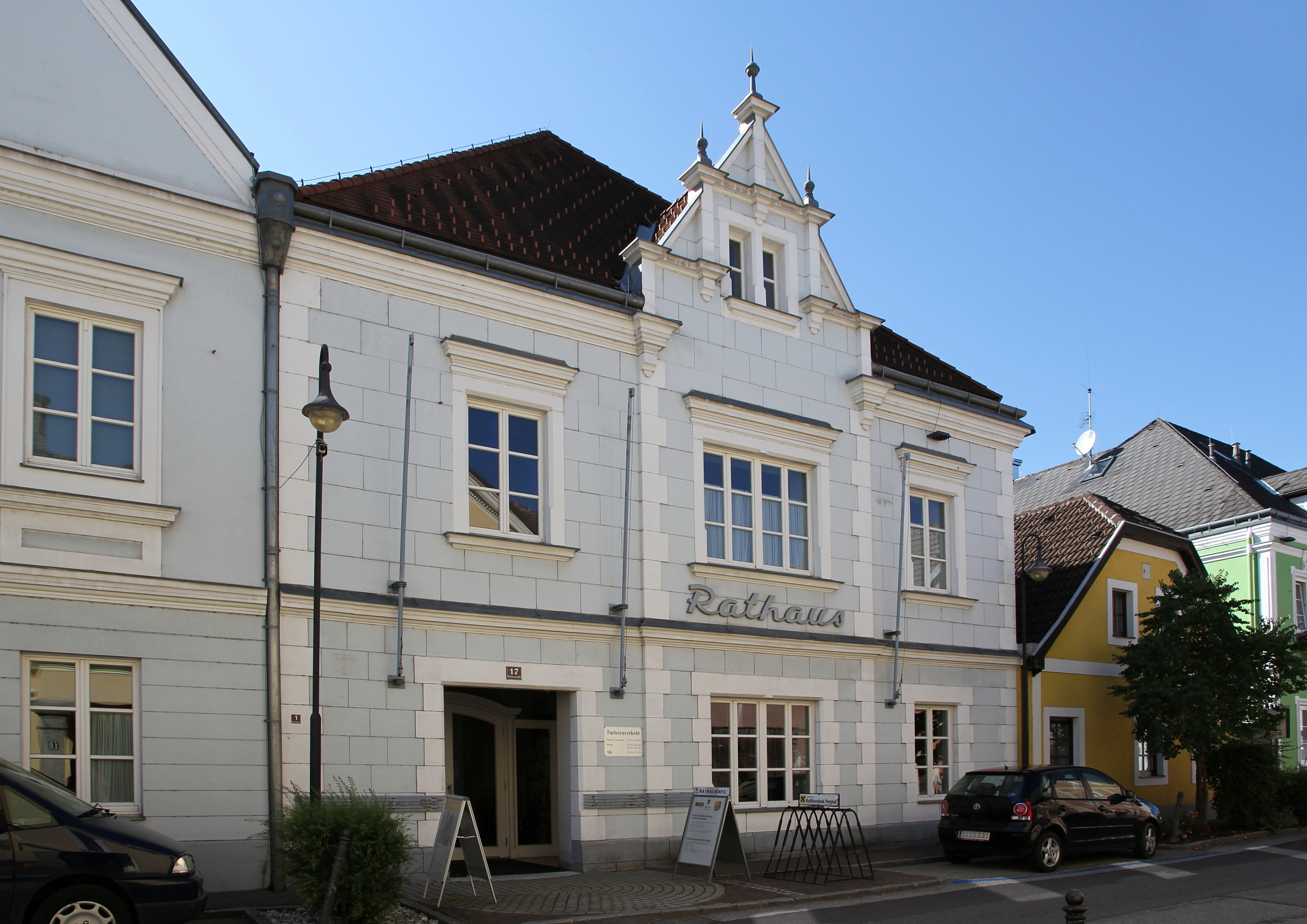
- Town hall

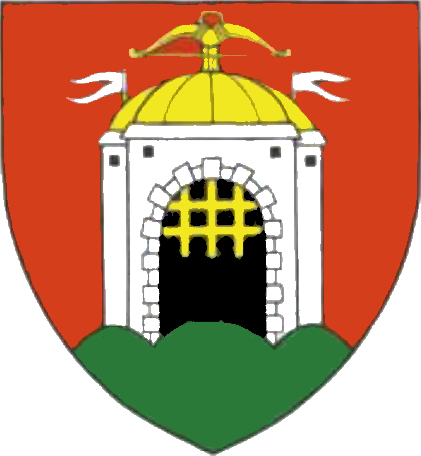
- Coat of arms

- Location within Austria
- Coordinates: 48°03′27″N 15°08′16″E
- Country: Austria
- State: Lower Austria
- District: Scheibbs

Government
  - Mayor: Harald Riemer (ÖVP)

Area
  - Total: 55.93 km^{2} (21.59 sq mi)
- Elevation: 299 m (981 ft)

Population (2018-01-01)
  - Total: 5,348
  - Density: 95.62/km^{2} (247.7/sq mi)
- Time zone: UTC+1 (CET)
  - Summer (DST): UTC+2 (CEST)
- Postal code: 3251
- Area code: +43 7489
- Vehicle registration: SB
- Website: www.purgstall.at

Purgstall an der Erlauf is a municipality in the district of Scheibbs in the Austrian state of Lower Austria.

== Population ==
Historical population
Year	Pop.	±%
1971	4,854	—
1981	5,231	+7.8%
1991	5,196	−0.7%
2001	5,211	+0.3%
2011	5,354	+2.7%
