= Gaming, Austria =

Gaming
- Municipality
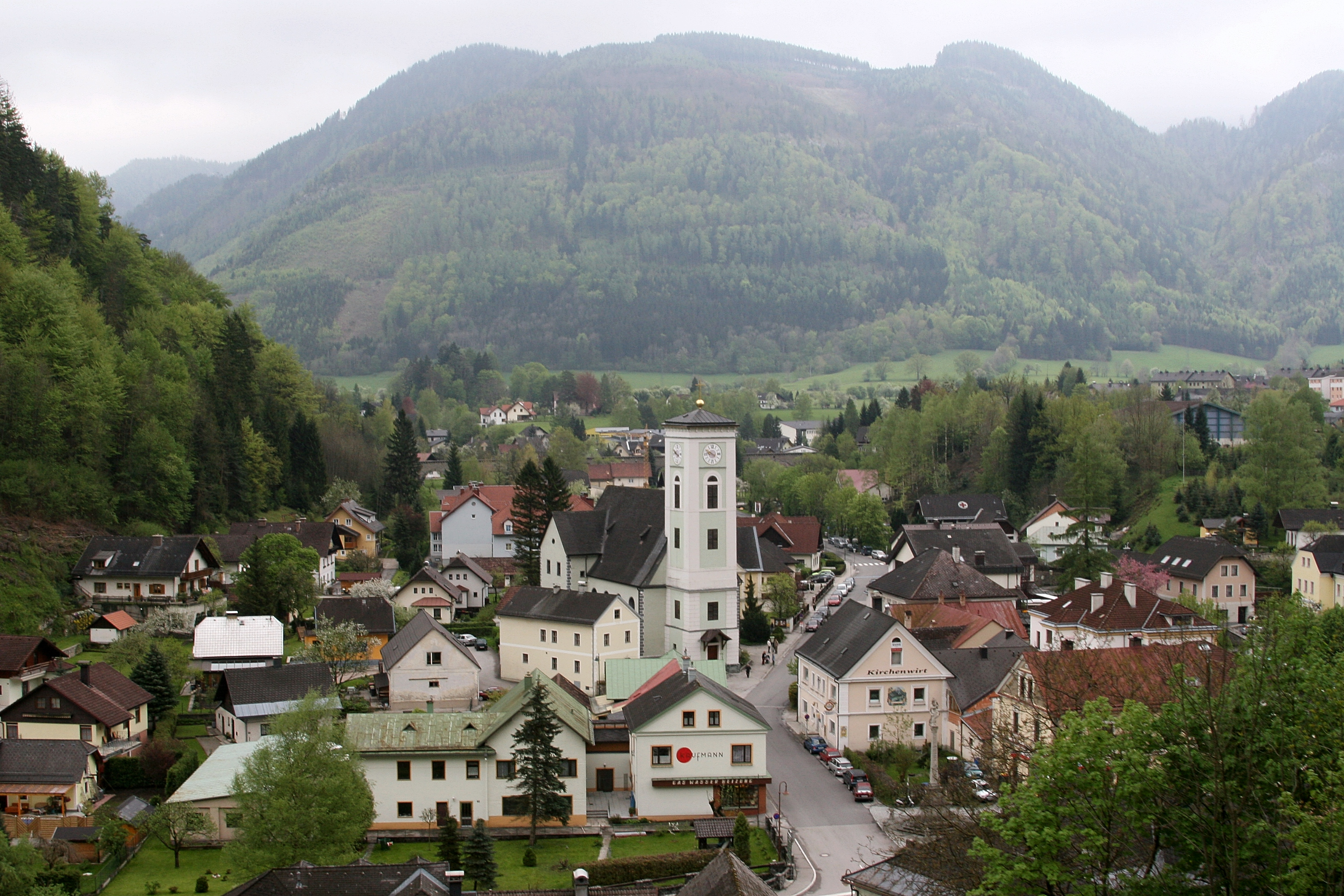
- Aerial view of Gaming, Austria

- Coat of arms

- Location within Austria
- Coordinates: 47°55′43″N 15°05′16″E
- Country: Austria
- State: Lower Austria
- District: Scheibbs

Government
  - Mayor: Renate Gruber (SPÖ)

Area
  - Total: 243.7 km^{2} (94.1 sq mi)
- Elevation: 431 m (1,414 ft)

Population (2018-01-01)
  - Total: 3,121
  - Density: 12.81/km^{2} (33.17/sq mi)
- Time zone: UTC+1 (CET)
  - Summer (DST): UTC+2 (CEST)
- Postal code: 3292
- Area code: 07485
- Vehicle registration: SB
- Website: www.gaming.gv.at

Gaming (German: [ˈɡamɪŋ]) is a municipality within the district of Scheibbs in Lower Austria. It is primarily known for an old Carthusian monastery existing within its borders. This served as the home and burial place of Duke Albert II of the Habsburg family, and now serves as the main campus for the Franciscan University of Steubenville's Study Abroad program.

== Geography ==
Gaming is located in Lower Austria in the district of Scheibbs. It is in the foothills of the Austrian Alps.

=== Tourism ===
Gaming is in the Ötscher region of Austria, an area that offers many natural attractions to tourists. One of these attractions is the Second Viennese Spring Water Channel, which starts at the base of the Alps and provides high quality water to Vienna. Near Gaming is the Ötscher - Tormauer Nature Park, which is the largest of the parks in Lower Austria, and is valued for its rivers, waterfalls, and rock formations. The Ötscher region also contains one of the last ancient forests existing within Central Europe.

The Franciscan University of Steubenville established its Gaming campus in the Kartause in 1991. Around 200 students per semester participate in the university's study abroad program.

== Demographics ==
Gaming had a population of 3,281 as of 1 January 2011. The population has been steadily decreasing over the past few years, due to a number of factors that have affected Austria in general since the 1970s, including: decreased birth rates, changes in attitudes towards marriage and bearing children, and increased contraception.

== Economy ==
Gaming's economy is primarily centered on lumber, agriculture, hunting, and fishing. Gaming has a high school devoted to the study and learning of agricultural practices.

== History ==
=== Early history ===
A settlement existed in Gaming in the early ninth century. Before becoming home to Slavs, it was initially settled by Celts, Germanic tribes, and Romans. The name Gaming derives from Slavic *kamenьnikъ (cf. Kamnik) and means 'place where there is stone, rocky terrain'. The land was taken over by the Avars, who were then defeated by Charlemagne at the end of the eighth century.

The area was soon Christianized by the Franks and the Bavarians, and was formally overseen by the province of Carinthia. The first mention of a parish priest in Gaming came from a document of 1274.

During the late Middle Ages, the iron trade formed most of Gaming's economy, as it played an important part in the economy of the nearby provinces of Styria. Consequently, the forests became the essential resource as well, since extreme heat was needed to make iron products. During this time, they developed systems for moving the wood, both via river and land. The structures which were kept in the place on the river still stands today.

=== Kartause in Gaming ===
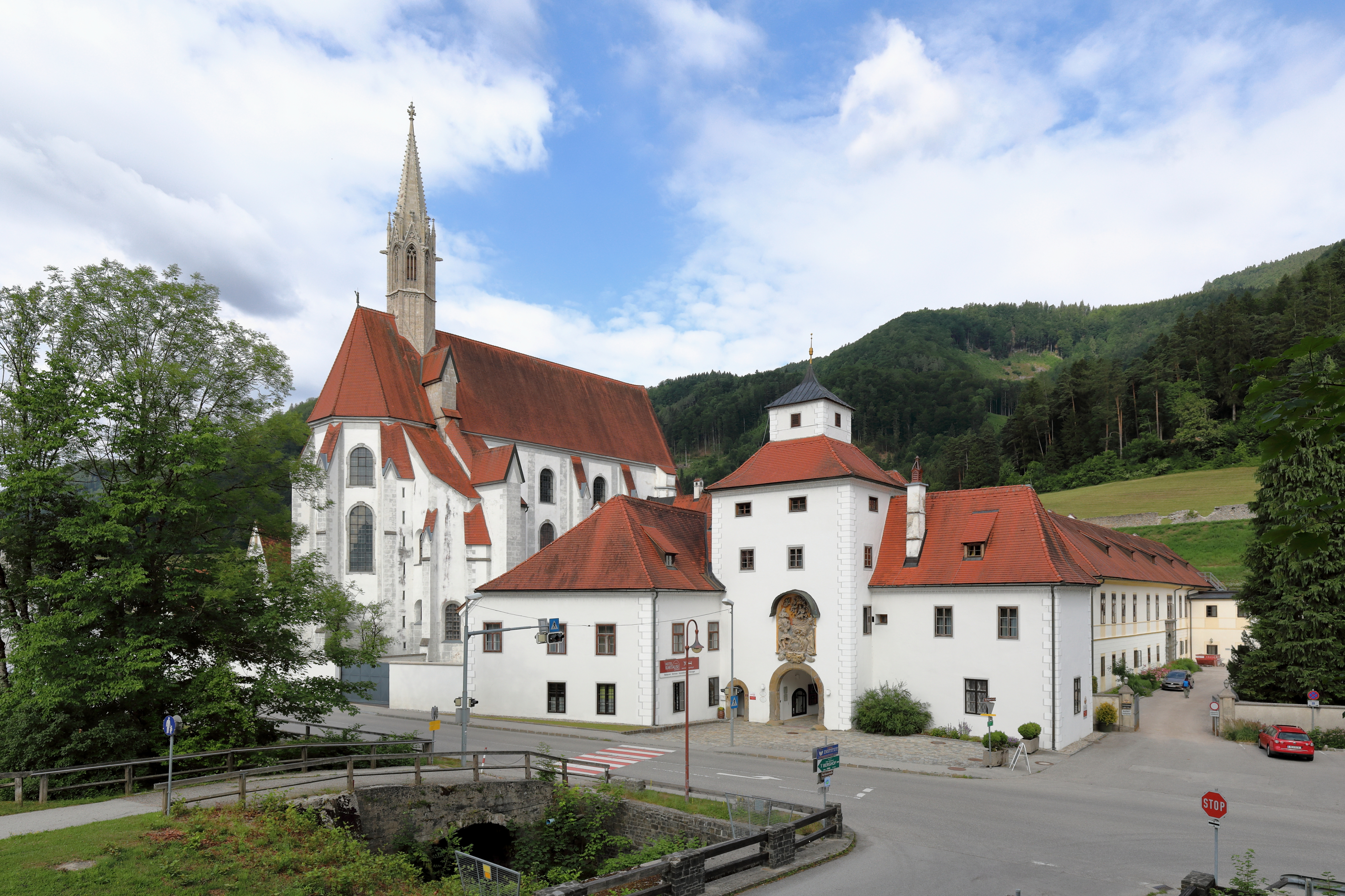
The Gaming charterhouse with church

In 1330, Duke Albert II of the Habsburg family got the endowment to form a charterhouse in Gaming. However, on 15 August 1332, the cornerstone for the Kartause was laid i.e., few years later. The Kartause Gaming was called "Mariathron", which means "Mary, Throne of Christ". It was intended to be a Carthusian monastery, his residence and the burial place for his family. The remains of Duke Albert, his wife, and his daughter-in-law are still in the crypt of the Kartause today.

The Carthusians who occupied the Kartause were given numerous resources, including many large tracts of land which were rented out to tenants, used for farming and for the raising of livestock. Those who lived on this land paid their dues with cheese, oats, clarified butter, roof shingles, and hoops made for wine barrels. The Carthusians were also given fishing rights for the surrounding ponds, lakes, and rivers. Their rights extended as far as the river of Ybbs, which was more than two hours away. Important sources of income included: wine (which was the most important export for Lower Austria at the time), vineyards, salt, iron, and forestry and hunting areas, as well as other market items such as cheese.

The Kartause served as the main parish for the village from 1334 to 1782. In 1782, the Kartause was suppressed and its monks were relieved of their vows. Over the course of about 200 years, the Kartause degraded, due to mishandling by its owners, lack of funding, and the damage caused by the Russian troops who began to occupy it in 1945.

Walter Hildebrand purchased the Kartause in 1983 and began to renovate it. Within the first ten years itself, sixty percent of the restoration process was complete. Renovations still continue today, mainly to expand the Kartause for the institutions that use it. The Kartause has served as a study abroad campus for Franciscan University of Steubenville in OH, US. It currently also serves as the base for the Language and Catechetical Institute, which gives students in post-Communist countries an opportunity to learn about Western countries, in the hope that they can help facilitate communication between the East and the West.
