= Reinsberg, Austria =

Reinsberg
- Municipality
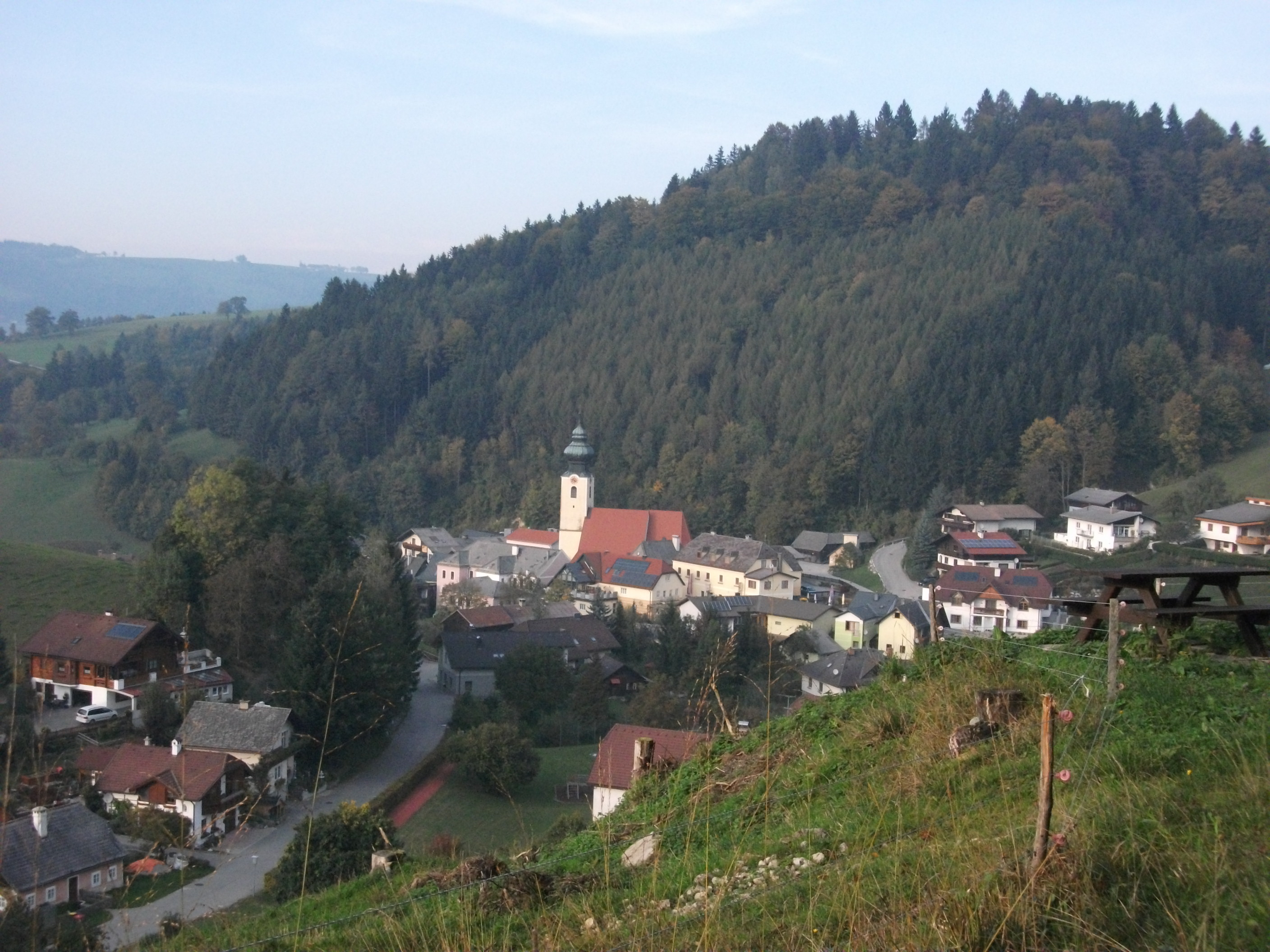
- View of Reinsberg

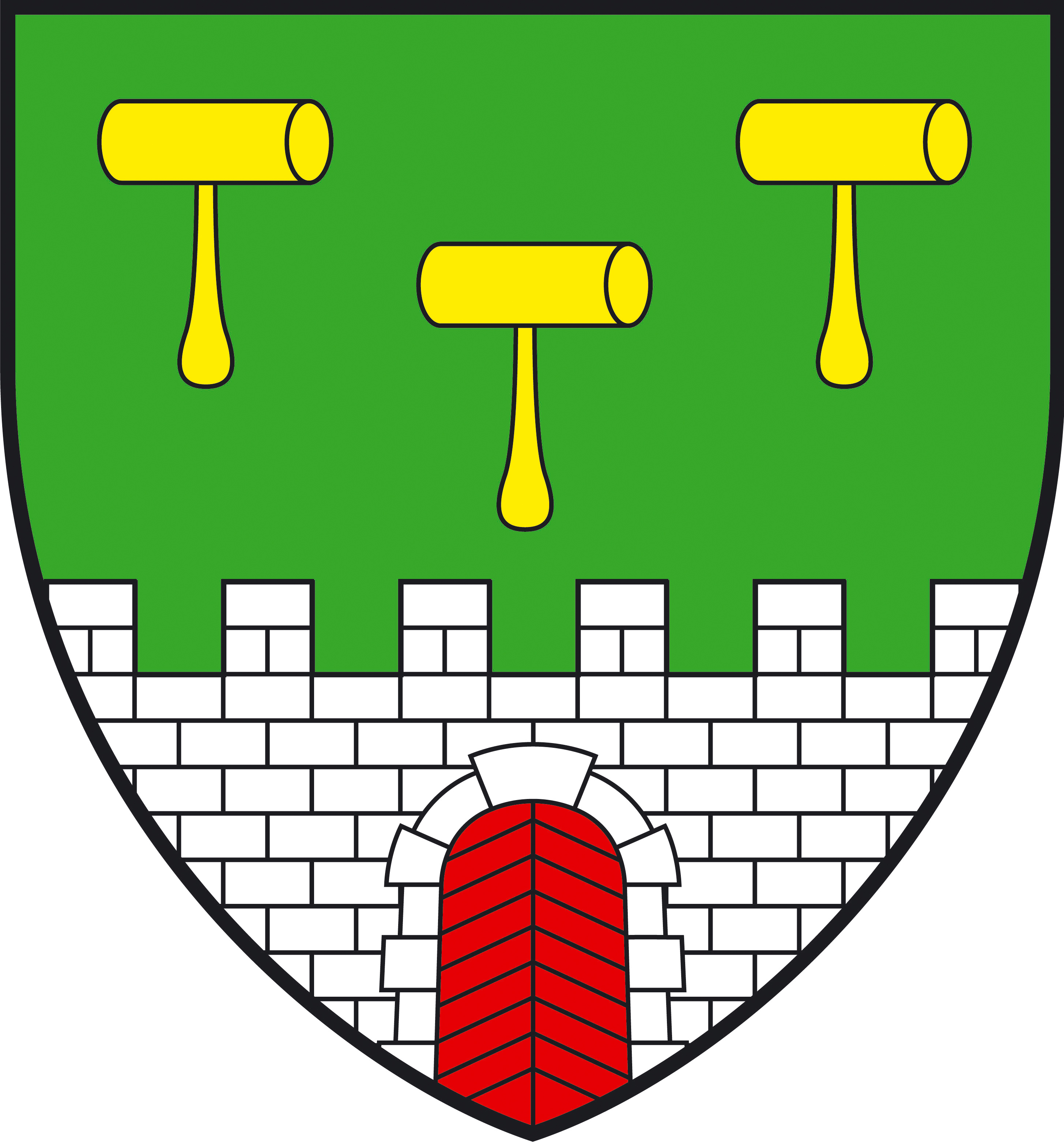
- Coat of arms

- Location within Austria
- Coordinates: 47°59′00″N 15°04′00″E
- Country: Austria
- State: Lower Austria
- District: Scheibbs

Government
  - Mayor: Franz Mayer (ÖVP)

Area
  - Total: 29.55 km^{2} (11.41 sq mi)
- Elevation: 477 m (1,565 ft)

Population (2018-01-01)
  - Total: 1,027
  - Density: 34.75/km^{2} (90.01/sq mi)
- Time zone: UTC+1 (CET)
  - Summer (DST): UTC+2 (CEST)
- Postal code: 3264
- Area code: 07487
- Vehicle registration: SB
- Website: http://www.reinsberg.at

Reinsberg (Austrian German pronunciation: [ˈraɪnsbɛrɡ]) is a municipality in the district of Scheibbs in the Austrian state of Lower Austria.

== Population ==
Historical population
Year	Pop.	±%
1971	739	—
1981	834	+12.9%
1991	947	+13.5%
2001	1,014	+7.1%
