= Randegg =

- Municipality
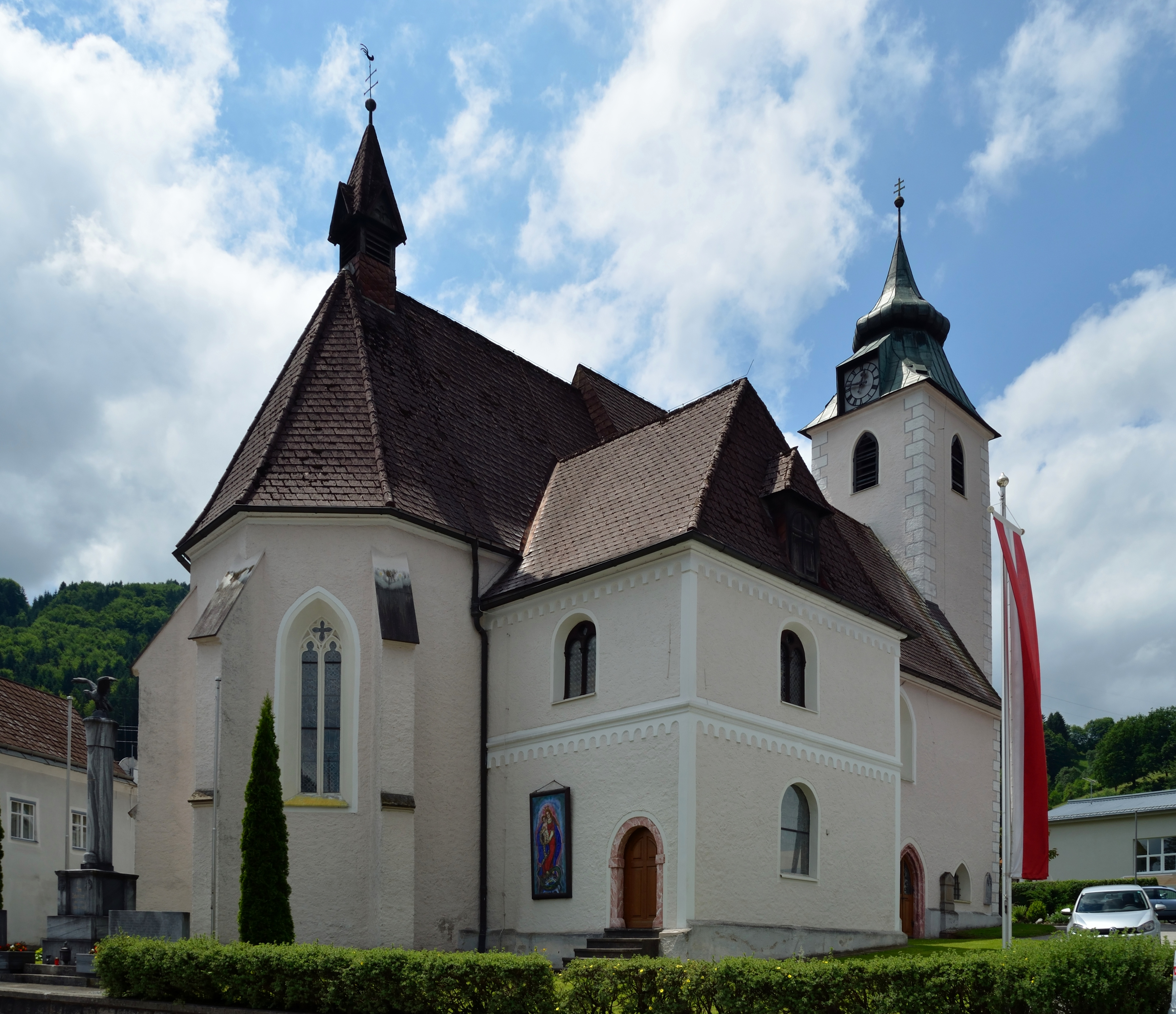
- Randegg parish church

- Coat of arms

- Location within Austria
- Coordinates: 48°00′40″N 14°58′22″E
- Country: Austria
- State: Lower Austria
- District: Scheibbs

Government
  - Mayor: Claudia Fuchsluger (ÖVP)

Area
  - Total: 51.88 km^{2} (20.03 sq mi)
- Elevation: 366 m (1,201 ft)

Population (2018-01-01)
  - Total: 1,880
  - Density: 36.2/km^{2} (93.9/sq mi)
- Time zone: UTC+1 (CET)
  - Summer (DST): UTC+2 (CEST)
- Postal code: 3263
- Area code: 07487
- Vehicle registration: SB
- Website: www.randegg.at

Randegg is a municipality in the district of Scheibbs in the Austrian state of Lower Austria.

== Population ==
Historical population
Year	Pop.	±%
1869	1,704	—
1900	1,852	+8.7%
1951	1,856	+0.2%
1961	1,857	+0.1%
1971	1,837	−1.1%
1981	1,842	+0.3%
1991	1,972	+7.1%
2001	1,934	−1.9%
2013	1,908	−1.3%
