= Scheibbs District =

Coordinates: 48.011°N 15.089°E

Scheibbs District Bezirk Scheibbs
- District
- Country: Austria
- State: Lower Austria
- Number of municipalities: 18
- Administrative seat: Scheibbs

Government
  - District Governor: Johann Seper (since 2010)

Area
  - Total: 1,023.5 km^{2} (395.2 sq mi)

Population (2024)
  - Total: 42,006
  - Density: 41.042/km^{2} (106.30/sq mi)
- Time zone: UTC+01:00 (CET)
  - Summer (DST): UTC+02:00 (CEST)
- Vehicle registration: SB
- NUTS code: AT121
- District code: 320

Bezirk Scheibbs is a district of the state of Lower Austria in Austria.

== Municipalities ==
Suburbs, hamlets and other subdivisions of a municipality are indicated in small characters.

- Gaming
  - Altenreith, Brettl, Gaming, Gamingrotte, Hofrotte, Holzhüttenboden, Kienberg, Lackenhof, Langau, Maierhöfen, Mitterau, Nestelberg, Neuhaus, Pockau, Polzberg, Rothwald, Steinwand, Taschelbach, Trübenbach, Zürner
- Göstling an der Ybbs
  - Eisenwiesen, Göstling an der Ybbs, Großegg, Hochreit, Königsberg, Lassing, Mendling, Oberkogelsbach, Pernegg, Steinbachmauer, Stixenlehen, Strohmarkt, Ybbssteinbach
- Gresten
  - Gresten, Ybbsbachamt
- Gresten-Land
  - Oberamt, Obergut, Schadneramt, Unteramt
- Lunz am See
- Oberndorf an der Melk
  - Altenmarkt, Bach, Baumbach, Diendorf, Dörfl, Dürrockert, Eck, Edlach, Ganz, Gries, Grub, Gstetten, Hameth, Hasenberg, Holzwies, Koppendorf, Lehen, Lingheim, Listberg, Maierhof, Melk, Oberdörfl, Oberhub, Oberndorf an der Melk, Oberschweinz, Ofenbach, Perwarth, Pfoisau, Pledichen, Reitl, Rinn, Schachau, Scheibenbach, Scheibenberg, Steg, Straß, Strauchen, Sulzbach, Unterdörfl, Unterhub, Unterschweinz, Waasen, Weg, Weissee, Wiedenhof, Wies, Wildengraben, Wildenmaierhof, Zehethof, Zehethof, Zimmerau
- Puchenstuben
  - Am Sulzbichl, Bergrotte, Brandeben, Brandgegend, Buchberg, Gösing an der Mariazellerbahn, Laubenbach, Puchenstuben, Schaflahn, Sulzbichl, Waldgegend
- Purgstall an der Erlauf
  - Ameishaufen, Edelbach bei Purgstall, Erb, Feichsen, Föhrenhain, Gaisberg, Galtbrunn, Gimpering, Haag, Harmersdorf, Heidegrund, Hochrieß, Höfl, Koth, Kroißenberg, Mayerhof, Nottendorf, Öd bei Purgstall, Petzelsdorf, Pögling, Purgstall, Reichersau, Rogatsboden, Schauboden, Sölling, Söllingerwald, Stock, Unternberg, Weigstatt, Weinberg, Zehnbach
- Randegg
  - Franzenreith, Graben, Hinterleiten, Hochkoglberg, Mitterberg, Perwarth, Puchberg bei Randegg, Randegg, Schliefau, Steinholz
- Reinsberg
  - Buchberg, Kerschenberg, Reinsberg, Robitzboden, Schaitten
- Scheibbs
  - Brandstatt, Fürteben, Fürteben, Ginning, Ginselberg, Heuberg, Hochbruck, Lueggraben, Miesenbach, Neubruck, Neustift, Saffen, Scheibbs, Scheibbsbach, Schöllgraben
- Sankt Anton an der Jeßnitz
  - Anger, Gabel, Gärtenberg, Gnadenberg, Grafenmühl, Gruft, Hochreith, Hollenstein, Kreuztanne, St. Anton an der Jeßnitz, Winterbach, Wohlfahrtsschlag
- Sankt Georgen an der Leys
  - Ahornleiten, Bach, Bichl, Dachsberg, Forsthub, Gries, Kandelsberg, Kreuzfeld, Kröll, Maierhof, Mitteröd, Oedwies, Ramsau, Schießer, St. Georgen an der Leys, Wiesmühl, Windhag, Zwickelsberg
- Steinakirchen am Forst
  - Altenhof, Amesbach, Brandstatt, Dürnbach, Edelbach, Edla, Ernegg, Felberach, Götzwang, Haberg, Hausberg, Kerschenberg, Kleinreith, Knolling, Lonitzberg, Lonitzberg, Oberstampfing, Ochsenbach, Oed bei Ernegg, Oedt, Reith bei Weinberg, Schollödt, Schönegg, Steinakirchen am Forst, Straß, Stritzling, Unterstampfing, Windpassing, Zehetgrub, Zehethof
- Wang
  - Berg, Ewixen, Griesperwarth, Grieswang, Höfling, Hofweid, Kaisitzberg, Lehmgstetten, Mitterberg, Nebetenberg, Pyhrafeld, Pyhrafeld, Reidlingberg, Reidlingdorf, Reitering, Schlott, Straß, Thurhofwang, Wang
- Wieselburg
- Wieselburg-Land
  - Bauxberg, Berging, Bodensdorf, Brandstetten, Breitenschollen, Brunning, Dürnbach, Forst am Berg, Furth, Galtbrunn, Großa, Grub, Gumprechtsfelden, Haag, Hart, Austria|Hart, Holzhäuseln, Hörmannsberg, Kaswinkel, Köchling, Kratzenberg, Krügling, Leimstetten, Marbach an der Kleinen Erlauf, Moos, Mühling, Neumühl, Oed am Seichten Graben, Oed beim Roten Kreuz, Pellendorf, Plaika, Schadendorf, Sill, Ströblitz, Unteretzerstetten, Wechling, Weinzierl
- Wolfpassing
  - Buch, Dörfl, Etzerstetten, Figelsberg, Fischerberg, Hofa, Keppelberg, Klein-Erlauf, Krottenthal, Linden, Loisingm, Stetten, Thorwarting, Thurhofglasen, Wolfpassing, Zarnsdorf
