= Lunz am See =

- Municipality
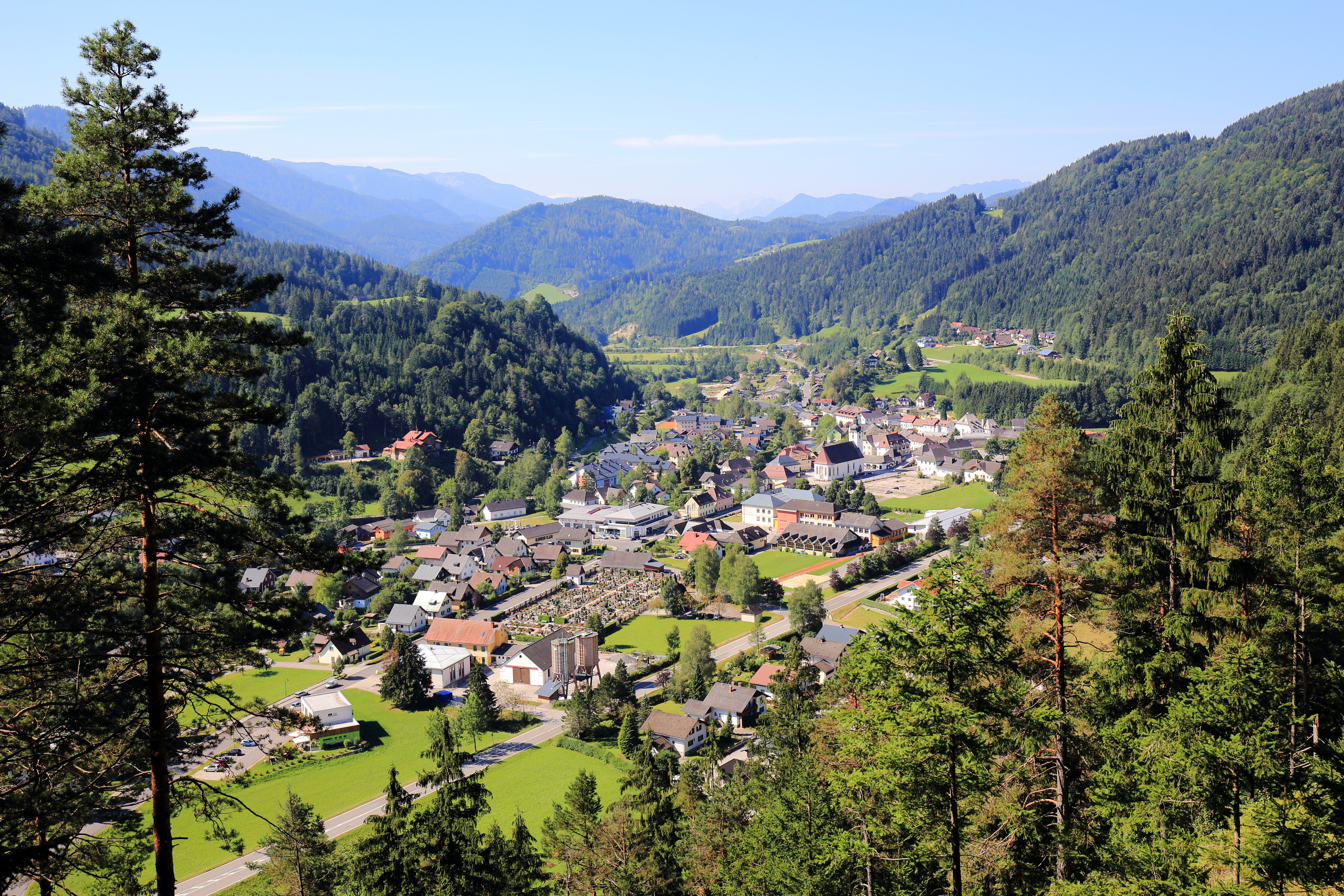
- Lunz am See

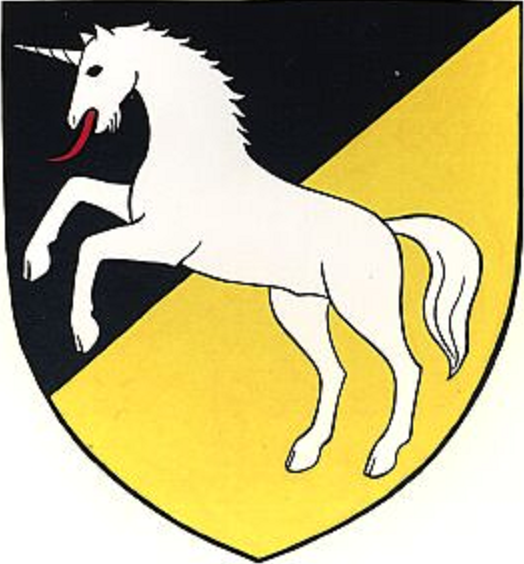
- Coat of arms

- Location within Austria
- Coordinates: 47°51′37.6″N 15°01′29.5″E
- Country: Austria
- State: Lower Austria
- District: Scheibbs

Government
  - Mayor: Josef Schachner (ÖVP)

Area
  - Total: 101.43 km^{2} (39.16 sq mi)
- Elevation: 601 m (1,972 ft)

Population (2018-01-01)
  - Total: 1,806
  - Density: 17.81/km^{2} (46.12/sq mi)
- Time zone: UTC+1 (CET)
  - Summer (DST): UTC+2 (CEST)
- Postal code: 3293
- Area code: 07486
- Vehicle registration: SB
- Website: www.lunz.at

Lunz am See is a municipality in the district of Scheibbs, Lower Austria, Austria.

Since May 2007 Lunz am See has been the home of the "Wasser Cluster Lunz". It has been recorded as the coldest place in Central Europe, as a temperature of −52.6 °C (−62.7 °F) was measured here on 19 February 1932 at 47°49′13.7″N 15°2′42″E.

== Population ==
Historical population
Year	Pop.	±%
1971	2,301	—
1981	2,219	−3.6%
1991	2,154	−2.9%
2001	2,045	−5.1%
