= List of Tetragrammatons in art in Austria =

List of artworks, containing the tetragrammaton, in Austria

The list of Tetragrammatons in art in Austria includes tetragrammatons found in Austrian art. Since the 16th century, artists have been using the tetragrammaton as a symbol for God, or for divine illumination. Since the 17th century, the tetragrammaton was inscribed on top of altars, or in center of frescos, often in rays of light or in a triangle. Moreover, on illustrations of Jewish High Priests (like Aaron) or Jewish Priests (like Zechariah), the tetragrammaton was used to illustrate the Priestly golden head plate. In the time of Nazism, efforts to eliminate alleged Jewish influence included to remove tetragrammatons.

The following list includes objects as buildings, frescos, altars, paintings, monuments and grave constructions in Austria still featuring the biblical name of God יהוה in Hebrew characters. The list does not include longer Hebrew text passages containing the name of God. By default, the list is sorted according to states of Austria, and to municipalities, in alphabetical order. If not otherwise mentioned, the listed church buildings are Catholic Churches.

State of Austria, municipality	Address / coordinates	Building	Object, description	Spelling	Work date	Image
Burgenland; Eberau	7521 Gaas 132a 47.0709°N 16.4545°E	Assumption Church Maria Weinberg	on top of right side altar	יהיה		
Burgenland; Forchtenstein	7212 Forchtenstein; Melinda Esterhazy-Platz 1; 47.7097°N 16.3317°E	Forchtenstein Castle	ceiling fresco of castle chapel	דהדה	1642	
Burgenland; Frankenau-Unterpullendorf	7361 Frankenau 37a 47.4465°N 16.6107°E	All Saints' Church Frankenau	on Holy Sepulchre	יהוה	ca. 1890	
Burgenland; Grafenschachen	7423 Grafenschachen, near No. 16; 47.3627°N 16.0671°E	Trinity Church Grafenschachen	on top of the subsidiary building on right side of church fore court	יהוה		
Burgenland; Loretto	2443 Loretto; Hauptplatz 22; 47.9144°N 16.5162°E	Basilica Maria Loretto	on the window above the altar of Peregrinus' Chapel	יהוה		
Burgenland; Nikitsch	7302 Kroatisch Minihof; Kirchenplatz; 47.5262°N 16.6453°E	Trinity Church Kroatisch Minihof	on Holy Sepulchre	יהוה	ca. 1890	
Burgenland; Stadtschlaining	7461 Stadtschlaining; Hauptplatz 3; 47.3236°N 16.2792°E	Synagogue Stadtschlaining	inscriptions (bible citations) on ceiling	יהוה		
Burgenland; Stotzing	2443 Stotzing; Kirchenplatz; 47.9048°N 16.5476°E	St. John the Baptist Church Stotzing	on top of main altar. artist: Elias Hügel (who had worked already on high altar in Karlskirche, Vienna, in 1719)	וו3וה	1750	
Burgenland; Weiden am See	7121 Weiden am See; Raiffeisenplatz; 47.9270°N 16.8682°E	Trinity Church Weiden am See	above main altar. design: Johann Lukas von Hildebrandt	והיה	1739	
Burgenland; Winden am See	7092 Winden am See; Kirchengasse 16; 47.9475°N 16.7585°E	St. Florian's Church Winden am See	on altarpiece	יהוה		
Carinthia; Arriach	9543 Arriach; Innerteuchen 5; 46.7308°N 13.9115°E	Holy Cross Church Klösterle-Innerteuchen	on altarpiece of right side altar. artist: Josef Ferdinand Fromiller	יהוה	1758	
Carinthia; Bleiburg	9150 Bleiburg near Kumeschgasse 16; 46.5890°N 14.7983°E	Garden of Religions	on sculpture representing Jewish religion in Garden of Religions, in front of rectory. artist: Rudi Benedik	יהוה	2009	
Carinthia; Feistritz ob Bleiburg	9143 St. Michael ob Bleiburg 9a 46.5788°N 14.7433°E	Saint Michael's Church ob Bleiburg	on altarpiece of main altar	ITIΠ		
Carinthia; Feldkirchen in Kärnten	9560 Feldkirchen in Kärnten; Hauptplatz; 46.7236°N 14.0920°E	main square	St. Maria's column	יהוה	1761	
Carinthia; Ferlach	9162 Kappel an der Drau; 46.5347°N 14.2476°E	Saint Zeno's Church Kappel an der Drau	St. Anne's altar (left side of church): upper painting of St. Stephen	הוהו		
Carinthia; Griffen	9112 Griffen; Stift Griffen 2; 46.6987°N 14.7039°E	Saint Mary of the Assumption Abbey Church Griffen	altarpiece on St. Augustinus' altar, on left side of church. Faded, tetragrammaton is hardly readable anymore			
Carinthia; Klagenfurt	9020 Klagenfurt near Auer-von-Welsbach-Straße 15; 46.6347°N 14.3241°E	St. Theresia Church Welzenegg	velum quadragesimale (visible in church only during lent). artist: Karl Schnabl and pupils.	יהו ה		
Carinthia; Klagenfurt	9020 Klagenfurt; Museumgasse 2; 46.6209°N 14.3124°E	Carinthia Museum	on Protestant altar, originally from Hohenstein castle chapel	יהוה		
Carinthia; Klagenfurt	9063 Maria Saal; St. Peter am Bichl; 46.6977°N 14.2690°E	Saint Peter am Bichl Church	on painting The Stoning of Saint Stephen	יהדה		
Carinthia; Malta	9854 Malta, near No. 52; 46.9546°N 13.5070°E	Saint Mary of the Assumption Church Malta	on top of side altar	יהוה		
Carinthia; Maria Rain	9161 Maria Rain; Göltschach 22; 46.5578°N 14.3364°E	Saint Daniel Church Göltschach	velum quadragesimale (visible in church only during lent). artist: Alexander Lesjak	יהוה	2018	
Carinthia; Maria Saal	9063 Maria Saal; Domplatz; 46.6811°N 14.3463°E	Saint Mary of the Assumption Church Maria Saal	ceiling fresco in right side chapel. artist: Johann Peter Wittini	יה.ה	1700	
Carinthia; Maria Saal	9063 Maria Saal; Arndorf; 46.6901°N 14.3600°E	Saint Leonard Church Arndorf	on altar cloth	יהוה		
Carinthia; Millstatt	9872 Millstatt; Stiftgasse 1; 46.8043°N 13.5710°E	Saviour's Abbey Church Millstatt	on painting John Francis Regis, in right aisle	יהדה		
Carinthia; Millstatt	9872 Millstatt; Stiftgasse 1; 46.8040°N 13.5713°E	Saviour's Abbey Church Millstatt	on painting in vestibule	דהדה		
Carinthia; Mölbling	9312 Mölbling; Meiselding; Kirchstraße; 46.8403°N 14.3970°E	Saint Andrew's Church Meiselding	painting on pipe organ: David playing harp	יהוה		
Carinthia; Moosburg	9062 Moosburg; Kirchplatz; 46.6574°N 14.1732°E	St. Michael's and St. Georg's Parish Church Moosburg	altarpiece main altar: on shield of St. Michael. Artist: Josef Ferdinand Fromiller	דהדה		
Carinthia; Ossiach	9570 Ossiach; Hauptplatz; 46.6775°N 13.9826°E	Saint Mary of the Assumption Abbey Church Ossiach	ceiling fresco: St. Catharina of Alexandria. Artist: Josef Ferdinand Fromiller	דהדח	ca. 1744	
Carinthia; Paternion	9711 Paternion; Anna-Plazotta-Platz; 46.7124°N 13.6376°E	Saint Paternian Pilgrimage Church Paternion	on top of main altar		1776	
Carinthia; Poggersdorf	9130 Poggersdorf; St. Michael 16; 46.6813°N 14.5034°E	Saint Michael's Church ob der Gurk	on altarpiece of right side altar	דההד		
Carinthia; Reichenau	9564 Reichenau; Wiedweg; 46.8179°N 13.8567°E	Protestant Church Wiedweg	on pulpit altar			
Carinthia; Sankt Andrä	9433 St. Andrä im Lavanttal; Wölzing-St. Andrä 1; 46.7702°N 14.8229°E	Saint Peter and Paul Pilgrimage Church Maria Loreto	painting of Vincent Ferrer, on right side of church	:ד≀:ד		
Carinthia; Sankt Paul im Lavanttal	9470 St. Paul im Lavanttal; Hauptstraße 1; 46.7006°N 14.8731°E	Saint Paul's Abbey Church, Lavanttal	on top of pulpit. artist: Michael Zill	יחדה	ca. 1770	
Carinthia; Sankt Paul im Lavanttal	9470 St. Paul im Lavanttal; Hauptstraße 1; 46.7006°N 14.8724°E	Saint Paul's Abbey, Lavanttal	on epitaph for Seyfried von Dietrichstein („Rabensteiner epitaph“), Protestant	יהוה	1583	
Carinthia; Sankt Paul im Lavanttal	9470 St. Paul im Lavanttal; Hauptstraße 5; 46.6997°N 14.8744°E	St. Erhard's Church, St. Paul i. L.	on altarpiece of left side altar. faded, only 2 1/2 characters readable anymore	דח...		
Carinthia; Sankt Veit an der Glan	9300 St. Veit an der Glan; St. Donat; Hochosterwitzer Straße 10; 46.7363°N 14.3936°E	Church St. Donat	altarpiece of St. Stephen's altar (left side of church)	חחEI	17th century	
Carinthia; Straßburg	9341 Straßburg; Pöckstein 1; 46.8909°N 14.4400°E	Castle Pöckstein	ceiling fresco of castle chapel	הוה	ca. 1790	
Carinthia; Straßburg	9341 Straßburg; St. Georgen 18; 46.9025°N 14.3779°E	Church St. Georgen unter Straßburg	church bell	הJיה	1620	
Carinthia; Straßburg	9341 Straßburg; Hauptplatz 1a 46.8958°N 14.3318°E	St. Nicholas Church Straßburg	Raphael's statue, right side altar	יהוה		
Carinthia; Straßburg	9341 Straßburg; Hauptplatz 1a 46.8958°N 14.3319°E	St. Nicholas Church Straßburg	altar in Cross chapel	יחוח	1648	
Carinthia; Straßburg	9341 Straßburg; Hauptplatz 1a 46.8958°N 14.3320°E	St. Nicholas Church Straßburg	altar in St. Michael's chapel	דח2ד		
Carinthia; Straßburg	9341 Straßburg; Schlossweg 6; 46.8976°N 14.3297°E	Straßburg castle	votive image St. Hemma of Gurk, in castle keep	חדחד		
Carinthia; Straßburg	9341 Straßburg; Schlossweg 6; 46.8976°N 14.3298°E	Straßburg castle	votive image St. Hemma of Gurk, in castle keep	דדJד		
Carinthia; Völkermarkt	9100 Völkermarkt; Kirchgasse; 46.6596°N 14.6361°E	Saint Mary Magdalene Church Völkermarkt	above of pulpit. artist: Michael Zill	יהדה	1769	
Carinthia; Wernberg	9241 Wernberg; Klosterweg; 46.6214°N 13.9293°E	Wernberg palace chapel	ceiling fresco. artist: Josef Ferdinand Fromiller	יהוה		
Carinthia; Wolfsberg	9400 Wolfsberg; Markusplatz; 46.8388°N 14.8450°E	Bakers' chapel	painting Holy Family	יהוה		
Lower Austria; Altenburg	3591 Altenburg; Abt Placidus Much Straße 1; 48.6433°N 15.5948°E	Altenburg Abbey Church	ceiling fresco Transfer of the Ark of the Covenant by David above the pipe organ. artist: Paul Troger	יהוה	1733	
Lower Austria; Altenburg	3591 Altenburg; Abt Placidus Much Straße 1; 48.6433°N 15.5950°E	Altenburg Abbey	ceiling fresco The Tribute Money in library: on forehead of Jewish priest. artist: Paul Troger		1742	
Lower Austria; Altenmarkt an der Triesting	2571 Altenmarkt an der Triesting; Hafnerberg 74; 48.0183°N 16.0140°E	Pilgrimage Church of Our Lady Hafnerberg	on top of left side altar	דהדה	ca. 1745	
Lower Austria; Altenmarkt an der Triesting	2571 Altenmarkt an der Triesting; Klein-Mariazell 1; 48.0365°N 15.9744°E	Saint Mary of the Assumption Pilgrimage Church Klein-Mariazell	ceiling fresco above the pipe organ. artist: Johann Wenzel Bergl	יהוה	ca. 1745	
Lower Austria; Artstetten-Pöbring	3661 Artstetten; Schlossplatz 1; 48.2425°N 15.2030°E	Saint James The Greater Church Artstetten	on pulpit	יהיה	ca. 1912	
Lower Austria; Baden bei Wien	2500 Baden; Helenenstraße 96; 48.0115°N 16.2048°E	Saint Helen's Church Baden	on top of modern setting of 16th-century's so-called potter's altar	יהוה	late 20th century	
Lower Austria; Baden bei Wien	2500 Baden; Helenenstraße 96; 48.0115°N 16.2047°E	Saint Helen's Church Baden	on top of a relief on lower part of the pulpit	יהיה	ca. 1760	
Lower Austria; Biberbach	3353 Biberbach; Im Ort; 48.0292°N 14.7089°E	St. Stephen's Church, Biberbach	altarpiece of Holy Helpers' altar (right side altar). artist: Johann Georg Staindorffer	הדהד	1681	
Lower Austria; Biedermannsdorf	2362 Biedermannsdorf; Ortsstraße 42; 48.0837°N 16.3460°E	Saint John the Baptist Church Biedermannsdorf	on top of main altar. artist: Josef Tallmann	יהוה	ca. 1730	
Lower Austria; Böheimkirchen	3140 Pottenbrunn; Maria Jeutendorf 41; 48.2436°N 15.7427°E	Pilgrimage Church Maria Jeutendorf	Saint Anne's altar (left side altar)	יהוה		
Lower Austria; Bruck an der Leitha	2462 Wilfleinsdorf; Hauptstraße 106; 48.0126°N 16.7228°E	Saint Peter and Paul Church Wilfleinsdorf	on top of the main altar	יהוה	1850	
Lower Austria; Brunn am Gebirge	2345 Brunn am Gebirge; Kirchengasse 9; 48.1071°N 16.2858°E	Saint Kunigunde's Church Brunn am Gebirge	on top of left side altar	הוהו		
Lower Austria; Drasenhofen	2165 Drasenhofen 174; 48.7548°N 16.6488°E	Saint Vitus Church Drasenhofen	on top of main altar	יהוה	ca. 1800	
Lower Austria; Drosendorf-Zissersdorf	2095 Drosendorf; Hauptplatz; 48.8684°N 15.6196°E	Saint Martin's Church Drosendorf	in former sacristy room below organ empore: Holy Tomb	יהוה	ca. 1890	
Lower Austria; Drosendorf-Zissersdorf	2095 Drosendorf-Altstadt; 48.8672°N 15.6289°E	Saint Peter and Paul Church Drosendorf-Altstadt	above right side altar	הודו		
Lower Austria; Drosendorf-Zissersdorf	2095 Drosendorf-Altstadt; 48.8672°N 15.6290°E	Saint Peter and Paul Church Drosendorf-Altstadt	on tabernacle (part of former altar)	יהוה		
Lower Austria; Drosendorf-Zissersdorf	2095 Zissersdorf northern of Zissersdorf; 48.8389°N 15.6298°E	Maria Schnee Church Zissersdorf	on top of altar	חחח	ca. 1760	
Lower Austria; Dürnstein	3601 Dürnstein 1; 48.3954°N 15.5191°E	Saint Mary of the Assumption Church Dürnstein (former abbey church)	relief Four Last Things at church portal	יהדד		
Lower Austria; Dürnstein	3601 Dürnstein 1; 48.3950°N 15.5194°E	Saint Mary of the Assumption Church Dürnstein (former abbey church)	on two windows left, and on two windows right of main altar	דהדה		
Lower Austria; Dürnstein	3601 Dürnstein 1; 48.3951°N 15.5192°E	Saint Mary of the Assumption Church Dürnstein (former abbey church)	several times on the balustrades in the cupolas of two chapels in the church	דהדה		
Lower Austria; Dürnstein	3601 Dürnstein 1; 48.3951°N 15.5191°E	Saint Mary of the Assumption Church Dürnstein (former abbey church)	painting in the right back of the church:forehead of high priest. artist: Carlo Haringer	CחII	1713	
Lower Austria; Dürnstein	3601 Dürnstein 1; 48.3954°N 15.51915°E	Saint Mary of the Assumption Church Dürnstein (former abbey church)	painting on church gallery: on priest's forehead	דחדח		
Lower Austria; Dürnstein	3601 Dürnstein 1; 48.3950°N 15.5193°E	Saint Mary of the Assumption Church Dürnstein (former abbey church)	relief on choir screen	יהוה		
Lower Austria; Dürnstein	3601 Dürnstein 1; 48.3950°N 15.5194°E	Saint Mary of the Assumption Church Dürnstein (former abbey church)	on two of the reliefs on left choir stalls			
Lower Austria; Dürnstein	3601 Dürnstein 1; 48.3950°N 15.5191°E	Saint Mary of the Assumption Church Dürnstein (former abbey church)	in the cloister: painting Presentation of Christ in the Temple, on high priest's forehead.	SחSI	ca. 1725	
Lower Austria; Eisgarn	3862 Eisgarn; Stiftsplatz 1; 48.9163°N 15.1002°E	Saint Mary of the Assumption Church Dürnstein	window: on forehead of Jewish priest	יהוה	ca. 1900	
Lower Austria; Ernstbrunn	2115 Ernstbrunn; Kirchenplatz 1; 48.5279°N 16.3606°E	Saint Martin Church Ernstbrunn	on Holy Tomb, in church's right side room	יהוה upside-down	ca. 1890	
Lower Austria; Fischamend	2401 Fischamend-Dorf; Kirchenweg 1; 48.1199°N 16.6029°E	Saint Quirinus Church Fischamend	on top of the main altar		18th century	
Lower Austria; Furth an der Triesting	2564 Furth an der Triesting 1; 47.9728°N 15.9732°E	Saint Mary Magdalene Church Furth an der Triesting	on ceiling fresco Jesus and the woman taken in adultery: on forehead of eight Jewish persons. artist: Franz Xaver Dobler		1795	
Lower Austria; Furth bei Göttweig	3511 Furth bei Göttweig; Stift Göttweig; 48.3666°N 15.6130°E	Göttweig Abbey Church	on top of Holy Trinity altar (left side altar)	יהוה	17th century	
Lower Austria; Gaming	3292 Gaming; Im Markt 25; 47.9233°N 15.0817°E	Gaming Charterhouse Church	ceiling fresco	יהוה		
Lower Austria; Gaming	3292 Gaming; Im Markt 25; 47.9233°N 15.0816°E	Gaming Charterhouse Church	fresco in lantern of church cupola	יה וה		
Lower Austria; Gaweinstal	2191 Gaweinstal; Kirchenplatz; 48.4780°N 16.5876°E	Saint George's Church Gaweinstal	on main altar	יהוה	1718	
Lower Austria; Geras	2093 Geras; Hauptstraße 1; 48.7980°N 15.6739°E	Geras Abbey	Abbey library: ceiling fresco. artist: Josef Winterhalder d. J.	יהוה	1805	
Lower Austria; Geras	2093 Geras; Hauptstraße 1; 48.7979°N 15.6738°E	Geras Abbey	fresco in winter refrectorium. artist: Franz Tomaschu	יהוא	1917	
Lower Austria; Gresten	3264 Gresten; Schloss Stiebar 1; 47.9747°N 15.0199°E	Stiebar Castle	castle chapel: above the apsis window	דחדח		
Lower Austria; Großebersdorf	2203 Großebersdorf; Pfarrhofgasse 3; 48.3639°N 16.4691°E	Saint Nicholas Church Großebersdorf	on altarpiece of main altar Saint Nicolas	והוה	ca. 1800	
Lower Austria; Gumpoldskirchen	2352 Gumpoldskirchen; Kirchenplatz; 48.0461°N 16.2743°E	Saint Michael's Church Gumpoldskirchen	altarpiece: on shield of St. Michael	יהדה		
Lower Austria; Hardegg	2082 Riegersburg 1; 48.8545°N 15.7718°E	Riegersburg Castle chapel	above the altar	יהוה	1755	
Lower Austria; Hauskirchen	2185 Prinzendorf an der Zaya; Am Schulberg; 48.5992°N 16.7171°E	Saint Mark's Church Prinzendorf	on top of main altar (transferred in 1787 from Dorotheer-Church Vienna to Prinzendorf)			
Lower Austria; Heiligenkreuz, Lower Austria	2532 Heiligenkreuz 1; 48.0549°N 16.1318°E	Heiligenkreuz Abbey	chapter house: fresco above coloured window		ca. 1710	
Lower Austria; Heiligenkreuz, Lower Austria	2532 Heiligenkreuz 1; 48.0548°N 16.1314°E	Heiligenkreuz Abbey	refectory: painting Faith, Hope and Charity	יהדה		
Lower Austria; Heiligenkreuz, Lower Austria	2532 Heiligenkreuz 1; 48.0551°N 16.1312°E	Heiligenkreuz Abbey	Prelate's room: intarsia on mahogany commode	יהוה		
Lower Austria; Herzogenburg	3130 Herzogenburg; Kirchenplatz; 48.2850°N 15.6973°E	Herzogenburg Monastery Church	on top of main altar. artist: Matthias Munggenast		ca. 1735	
Lower Austria; Herzogenburg	3130 Herzogenburg; Kirchenplatz; 48.2870°N 15.6969°E	Herzogenburg Monastery	abbey chapel (choir chapel): on top of altar	יהיהי	ca. 1740	
Lower Austria; Herzogenburg	3454 Herzogenburg; Heiligenkreuz 1; 48.2904°N 15.7802°E	Saint Mary of the Assumption Church Heiligenkreuz / Church Heiligenkreuz-Gutenbrunn	on top of main altar. artist: Johann Ferdinand Hetzendorf von Hohenberg	יהוה	ca. 1760	
Lower Austria; Hoheneich	3945 Hoheneich; Marktplatz 93; 48.7720°N 15.0260°E	Immaculate Conception Church Hoheneich	on high altar, below the tabernacle	וידדה	ca. 1780	
Lower Austria; Hollabrunn	2020 Aspersdorf 2; 48.5852°N 16.0965°E	Saint George's Church Aspersdorf	altarpiece of main altar. artist: Johann Georg Schmidt			
Lower Austria; Hollabrunn	2020 Aspersdorf 2; 48.5852°N 16.0965°E	Saint George's Church Aspersdorf	on Holy Tomb, established only in Holy Week	יהוה	ca. 1890	
Lower Austria; Kapelln	3141 Kapelln an der Perschling; Kirchenplatz; 48.2585°N 15.75513°E	Saint Petronilla Church Kapelln	Holy Tomb	יהוה	ca. 1890	
Lower Austria; Kilb	3233 Kilb; Kirchenweg; 48.1009°N 15.4093°E	Saint Simon and Jude Church Kilb	painting above the main altar	יהוה		
Lower Austria; Kirchschlag in der Buckligen Welt	2860 Kirchschlag in der Buckligen Welt; Passionsspielstraße 3; 47.5033°N 16.2963°E	Saint John the Baptist Church Kirchschlag in der Buckligen Welt	on top of main altar	יחיח	1792	
Lower Austria; Korneuburg	2100 Korneuburg; Laaer Straße 1; 48.3452°N 16.3316°E	Order of Saint Augustine Church Korneuburg	on top of main altar	יהוה	ca. 1770	
Lower Austria; Laxenburg	2361 Laxenburg; Schlossplatz 5; 48.0686°N 16.3573°E	Triumph of the Cross Church Laxenburg	on top of main altar. artist: Johann Ferdinand Hetzendorf von Hohenberg	יהוה	1784	
Lower Austria; Maissau	3712 Maissau; Kirchenplatz 1; 48.5721°N 15.8236°E	Castle Maissau	above back castle portal	יהוה		
Lower Austria; Maria Enzersdorf	2344 Maria Enzersdorf; Hauptstraße 5; 48.1010°N 16.2847°E	Franciscan Church Maria Enzersdorf	on pulpit	הוה	ca. 1760	
Lower Austria; Maria Enzersdorf	2344 Maria Enzersdorf; Gabrielerstraße 171; 48.0945°N 16.2973°E	Holy Spirit Church St. Gabriel	mosaic high up in aisle	יהוה	ca. 1900	
Lower Austria; Maria Enzersdorf	2344 Maria Enzersdorf; Gabrielerstraße 171; 48.0948°N 16.2975°E	Holy Spirit Church St. Gabriel	on glass window above ark of the covenant	יהוה	ca. 1900	
Lower Austria; Maria Taferl	3672 Maria Taferl 1; 48.2253°N 15.1562°E	Pilgrimage Church Maria Taferl	above statue of Moses, on left side of Holy Cross altar (right side altar). artist: Johann Georg Dorfmeister	יהיה	1781	
Lower Austria; Michelhausen	3441 Pixendorf; Kapellenweg; 48.2875°N 15.9770°E	Saint Anthony the Great and Paul Chapel Pixendorf	on altarpiece	יהיה	1785	
Lower Austria; Mistelbach	2192 Kettlasbrunn; Sebastianiplatz; 48.5614°N 16.6565°E	Saint Sebastian's Church Kettlasbrunn	on Holy Tomb, established only in Holy Week	יהוה	1895	
Lower Austria; Mistelbach	2192 Kettlasbrunn; Sebastianiplatz; 48.5614°N 16.6566°E	Saint Sebastian's Church Kettlasbrunn	on top of main altar	יהוה	ca. 1789	
Lower Austria; Münchendorf	2482 Münchendorf; Kirchenplatz; 48.0301°N 16.3786°E	Saint Leonard's Church Münchendorf	on top of main altar (transferred in 18th century from Vienna Hofburg chapel to Münchendorf)	הוה	18th century	
Lower Austria; Obritzberg-Rust	3123 Obritzberg 1; 48.2902°N 15.5936°E	Saint Lawrence's Church Obritzberg	on top of main altar	הiה¬	ca. 1735	
Lower Austria; Purkersdorf	3002 Purkersdorf; Pfarrhofgasse 1; 48.2074°N 16.1756°E	Saint James the Greater Church Purkersdorf	main altar: above tabernacle	יהוה	1727	
Lower Austria; Retzbach	2074 Unterretzbach; 48.7652°N 16.0067°E	Saint James the Greater Church Unterretzbach	on Holy Sepulchre (established in the church only in Holy Week)	יהוה	ca. 1890	
Lower Austria; Rosenburg-Mold	3580 Maria Dreieichen; 48.6512°N 15.7167°E	Basilica Maria Dreieichen	ceiling fresco above pipe organ. artist: Johann Baptist Wenzel Bergl	יהוה	1771	
Lower Austria; Rosenburg-Mold	3580 Maria Dreieichen; 48.6513°N 15.7167°E	Basilica Maria Dreieichen	ceiling fresco. artist: Johann Baptist Wenzl Bergl	יהוה	1771	
Lower Austria; Rosenburg-Mold	3580 Maria Dreieichen; 48.6513°N 15.7169°E	Basilica Maria Dreieichen	on top of Saint Felice of Cantalice altar (right side altar)	יהוה		
Lower Austria; Rosenburg-Mold	3580 Maria Dreieichen; 48.6514°N 15.7165°E	Basilica Maria Dreieichen	on top of Saint Peter and Paul altar (left side altar)	יהוה		
Lower Austria; Sankt Pölten	3100 Sankt Pölten; Domplatz 1; 48.2051°N 15.6275°E	Assumption of Mary Cathedral Sankt Pölten	above the main altar	יהדה		
Lower Austria; Sankt Pölten	3100 Sankt Pölten; Domplatz 1; 48.2051°N 15.6274°E	Assumption of Mary Cathedral Sankt Pölten	chancel ceiling fresco Adoration of the Name of God. artists: Friedrich Gedeon, Daniel Gran	יהדה	ca. 1740	
Lower Austria; Sankt Pölten	3100 Sankt Pölten; Domplatz 1; 48.2055°N 15.6272°E	former abbey of Canons Regular of Saint Augustine, Sankt Pölten	room between the library halls: ceiling fresco The fear of the Lord is the beginning of wisdom. artist: Daniel Gran	יהוה	1745	
Lower Austria; Sankt Pölten	3100 Sankt Pölten; Domplatz 1; 48.2054°N 15.6272°E	former abbey of Canons Regular of Saint Augustine, Sankt Pölten	on book case in library	יוווה		
Lower Austria; Scheibbs	3270 Scheibbs; Rathausplatz 6; 48.0047°N 15.1680°E	St. Mary of Magdala Church Scheibbs	on altarpiece of left side altar (St. Anne's altar)	יהוה	ca. 1710	
Lower Austria; Scheibbs	3270 Scheibbs; Rathausplatz 6; 48.0046°N 15.1681°E	St. Mary of Magdala Church Scheibbs	on Holy Tomb, established in the church only every second year in Holy Week	יהוה	ca. 1890	
Lower Austria; Schönbühel-Aggsbach	3394 Schönbühel an der Donau; Am Klosterberg; 48.2627°N 15.3770°E	former monastery church Schönbühel	in side chapel			
Lower Austria; Schottwien	2641 Schottwien; Passionsspielstraße 3; 47.6417°N 15.8695°E	Saint Mary of the Assumption Church Mariaschutz	on Saint Patrick's altar (right side altar)	הההו	1792	
Lower Austria; Sonntagberg	3332 Sonntagberg; Ort Sonntagberg; 47.9963°N 14.7626°E	Pilgrimage Church of the Holy Trinity and of St. Michael, Sonntagberg	on forehead of Aaron statue on left side of main altar. artist: Jakob Christoph Schletterer	יהוה	ca. 1750	
Lower Austria; Sonntagberg	3332 Sonntagberg; Ort Sonntagberg; 47.9963°N 14.7627°E	Pilgrimage Church of the Holy Trinity and of St. Michael, Sonntagberg	on baldachin above the main altar. artist: Melchior Hefele	יהוה	ca. 1750	
Lower Austria; Sonntagberg	3332 Sonntagberg; Ort Sonntagberg; 47.9964°N 14.7625°E	Pilgrimage Church of the Holy Trinity and of St. Michael, Sonntagberg	on left column of St. Mary's altar	יהוה		
Lower Austria; Spitz	3620 Spitz; Kirchenplatz; 48.3659°N 15.4145°E	Saint Mauritius Church Spitz	upper painting on high altar	יהוה		
Lower Austria; Spitz	3620 Spitz; Kirchenplatz; 48.3659°N 15.4146°E	Saint Maurice Church Spitz	paneling behind the main altar: on three paintings with Old Testament scenes (Nine choirs of Angels, Noah praying after the Flood, Abrahams visitors)	דהדה	ca. 1610	
Lower Austria; Stronsdorf	2153 Stronsdorf 2a 48.6503°N 16.2993°E	Saint Mary of Assumption Church Stronsdorf	on Holy Sepulchre, established in the church in the Holy Week	יהוה	ca. 1890	
Lower Austria; Traiskirchen	2514 Traiskirchen; Wiener Straße 28; 48.0176°N 16.2954°E	Saint Margaret's Church Traiskirchen	on pulpit. artists: Josef Resler, Martin Nösselthaller	יהדה	1764	
Lower Austria; Tulln an der Donau	3430 Tulln; Wiener Straße 20a 48.3314°N 16.0568°E	Saint Stephen's Church Tulln	on top of right side altar	חiח		
Lower Austria; Unserfrau-Altweitra	3970 Altweitra; 48.7216°N 14.9068°E	Saint Peter's and Paul's Church Altweitra	on top of main altar	חiTI	ca. 1760	
Lower Austria; Viehdorf	3322 Viehdorf; Dorfplatz; 48.1505°N 14.8935°E	St. Peter and Paul Church, Viehdorf	on altarpiece	יהוה	ca. 1750	
Lower Austria; Vösendorf	2331 Vösendorf; Kirchenplatz; 48.1222°N 16.3384°E	Saint Simon und Jude the Apostle Church Vösendorf	on top of main altar	יחוח	1823	
Lower Austria; Wiener Neustadt	2700 Wiener Neustadt; Domplatz 1; 47.8150°N 16.2428°E	Saint Mary of the Assumption Church (Cathedral)	on top of main altar. artist: Gabriele Molinarola	יהוה	1776	
Lower Austria; Wiener Neustadt	2700 Wiener Neustadt; Neuklostergasse; 47.8119°N 16.2469°E	Neukloster Monastery, Wiener Neustadt	ceiling fresco in library. artist: Johann Baptist Wenzel Bergl. faded, hardly readable.		1767	
Lower Austria; Wullersdorf	2041 Wullersdorf; Melkergasse 1; 48.6271°N 16.1030°E	Saint George's Church Wullersdorf	altarpiece of main altar: on St. Michael's shield. artist: Johann Höfl		1828	
Lower Austria; Ybbs an der Donau	3374 Säusenstein; Kirchenberg 6; 48.1907°N 15.1167°E	St. Donatus Church, Säusenstein	ceiling fresco "Glorification of St. John and St. Paul" above the pipe organ. Artist: Johann Wenzel Bergl	יהוה	1767	
Lower Austria; Zellerndorf	2051 Zellerndorf; Watzelsdorf 182; 48.6949°N 15.9823°E	Triumph of the Cross Church Watzelsdorf	ceiling fresco	יהוה	ca. 1800	
Salzburg; Bramberg am Wildkogel	5733 Bramberg am Wildkogel; Kirchengasse 1; 47.2734°N 12.3464°E	Saint Lawrence and Barthelemew Church Bramberg am Wildkogel	on lower part of pulpit: painting Allegory of Love	JΠJΠ		
Salzburg; Lamprechtshausen	5112 Lamprechtshausen; Arnsdorf; Stille-Nacht-Platz; 47.9691°N 12.9527°E	Maria im Mösl Church	altarpiece of right side altar			
Salzburg; Nußdorf am Haunsberg	5151 Nußdorf am Haunsberg; Lauterbach; 48.0018°N 13.0403°E	St. Giles Church Lauterbach	altarpiece of left side altar. artist: Franz Nikolaus Streicher		1770	
Salzburg; Salzburg	5020 Salzburg; Franz-Josefs-Kai 21; 47.8021°N 13.0386°E	St. Mark's Church Salzburg	fresco above the main altar. artist: Christoph Anton Mayr	יהוה	1756	
Salzburg; Salzburg	5020 Salzburg; Franziskanergasse 5; 47.7982°N 13.0441°E	Franciscan Church, Salzburg	behind the main altar: above the Holy Trinity Chapel	דחדח		
Salzburg; Salzburg	5020 Salzburg; Franziskanergasse 5; 47.7981°N 13.0441°E	Franciscan Church, Salzburg	behind the main altar. faded, only partly readable			
Salzburg; Salzburg	5020 Salzburg; Herbert-von-Karajan-Platz 1; 47.7995°N 13.0409°E	Sacellum Church	altarpiece of left side altar		1750	
Salzburg; Salzburg	5020 Salzburg; Linzergasse 41; 47.8045°N 13.0470°E	St. Sebastian cemetery, Salzburg	painting on grave of Martin Anselm Ritter von Reichel	הוהו	ca. 1851	
Salzburg; Salzburg	5020 Salzburg; Mozartplatz 1; 47.7984°N 13.0475°E	New Residence	ceiling of the Glory Hall. artist: Elia Castello	והוה	1602	
Salzburg; Salzburg	5020 Salzburg; Residenzplatz 1; 47.7987°N 13.0456°E	Old Residence Salzburg	ceiling frescos of Retirada room: on foreheads of several persons on three paintings (Alexanders vision of the High Priest, Alexander and the High Priest Jaddua, Jaddua explains the Book of Daniel). artist: Martino Altomonte	יהוה	ca. 1710	
Salzburg; Salzburg	5020 Salzburg; Residenzplatz 8; 47.7989°N 13.0469°E	St. Michael's Church Salzburg	ceiling fresco Glorification of The Name of God. artist: Franz Xaver König	והוה	1770	
Salzburg; Salzburg	5020 Salzburg; Residenzplatz 8; 47.7989°N 13.0470°E	St. Michael's Church Salzburg	altarpiece of main altar. artist: Tobias Bock	יהוה	1650	
Salzburg; Salzburg	5020 Salzburg; Sankt Peter-Bezirk 1; 47.7969°N 13.0458°E	Saint Peter's Church Salzburg	altarpiece of one of the left side altars. artist: Johann Karl von Reselfeld	הוה⊃	1704	
Salzburg; Salzburg	5020 Salzburg; Sankt Peter-Bezirk 1; 47.7968°N 13.0459°E	Saint Peter's Church Salzburg	fresco St. Benedict on south-east facade. artist: Franz Xaver König?	וחח.	ca. 1770	
Salzburg; Salzburg	5020 Salzburg; Sankt Peter-Bezirk 1; 47.7965°N 13.0457°E	Saint Peter's Churchyard, Salzburg	tomb No. 16 (Hagenauer family tomb)	והוה	ca. 1798	
Salzburg; Salzburg	5020 Salzburg; Sankt Peter-Bezirk 1; 47.7965°N 13.0455°E	Saint Peter's Churchyard, Salzburg	tomb No. 45 (clergymen's tomb)	יהוה	1934	
Styria; Admont	8911 Admont; Kirchplatz 1; 47.5758°N 14.4606°E	Admont Abbey	in central ceiling fresco of the library, by Bartolomeo Altomonte	יהוה	1784	
Styria; Admont	8911 Admont; Aigen; Schlossstrasse 32; 47.5667°N 14.4529°E	Roethelstein Castle	ceiling fresco St. Benedict and St. Blasius praying for Admont abbey, in the dining hall	חוחו	1753/54	
Styria; Bad Aussee	8990 Bad Aussee; Kirchengasse 25; 47.6115°N 13.7876°E	Conversion of Saint Paul Church Bad Aussee	St. Zechariah statue on left side of the altar in baptism chapel, on priest's golden plate	דחҦ	ca. 1740	
Styria; Breitenau am Hochlantsch	8614 Breitenau am Hochlantsch; St. Erhard 21; 47.3862°N 15.4547°E	Saint Erhard of Regensburg Church in der Breitenau	altarpiece Saint Erhard of Regensburg of main altar	דהדה	1646	
Styria; Feistritztal	8222 Sankt Johann bei Herberstein 7; 47.2144°N 15.8198°E	St. John the Baptist's Church near Herberstein	on top of main altar	יחוח	ca. 1672	
Styria; Gaishorn am See	8783 Gaishorn am See 9; 47.4908°N 14.5500°E	Trinity Church Gaishorn	on Trinity symbol on southern church entrance.	יהוה	?	
Styria; Gaishorn am See	8783 Gaishorn am See 9; 47.4908°N 14.5503°E	Trinity Church Gaishorn	altarpiece of side altar.		ca. 1670	
Styria; Gaishorn am See	8783 Gaishorn am See 57; 47.4912°N 14.5485°E	Protestant Peace Church Gaishorn	above altar from end of 19th century. Tetragrammaton removed in 1938; reconstructed in 2022.	יהוה	2022	
Styria; Gratwein-Straßengel	8111 Judendorf-Straßengel; Am Kirchberg 20; 47.1131°N 15.3388°E	Pilgrimage Church of the Most Holy Name of Mary Straßengel	above St. Anne's altar. artist: Johann Christoph Crassberger	יהוח	1723	
Styria; Graz	8010 Graz; Franziskanerplatz 14; 47.0706°N 15.4368°E	Franciscan Church, Graz	on glass window. artist: Basilia Gürth	יהוה	ca. 1985	
Styria; Graz	8010 Graz; Burggasse; 47.0719°N 15.4422°E	St. Giles' Cathedral Graz	ceiling fresco of Plague Chapel	יהוה	1618	
Styria; Graz-Mariatrost	8044 Graz-Mariatrost; Kirchplatz 8; 47.1070°N 15.4912°E	Nativity of Mary Basilica Mariatrost	ceiling fresco of one of the left side chapels	הLהL	ca. 1750	
Styria; Graz-Mariatrost	8044 Graz-Mariatrost; Kirchplatz 8; 47.1072°N 15.4914°E	Nativity of Mary Basilica Mariatrost	altarpiece Nativity of Mary, left side altar	ידדה	ca. 1750	
Styria; Graz-Mariatrost	8044 Graz-Mariatrost; Kirchplatz 8; 47.1071°N 15.4913°E	Nativity of Mary Basilica Mariatrost	above St. Michael's altar	הLהL	ca. 1750	
Styria; Graz	8046 Graz-Andritz; St. Veiter Straße 86; 47.1159°N 15.4114°E	St. Vitus' Church, Graz	above the pulpit	והו	ca. 1745	
Styria; Graz	8054 Graz; Florianibergstraße 15; 47.0221°N 15.3991°E	Maria im Elend Church, Graz	on glass window (right side of main altar)	דהדה		
Styria; Groß Sankt Florian	8522 Groß Sankt Florian; Oberer Markt 1; 46.8233°N 15.3159°E	Saint Florian Church Groß Sankt Florian	altarpiece of St. Michael's altar (right side altar)	יהדה		
Styria; Heiligenkreuz am Waasen	8081 Heiligenkreuz am Waasen; Friedensplatz 1; 46.9751°N 15.5461°E	Haus der Stille	Franciscus' Chapel: ambo. artist: Thomas Resetarits	יהוה	2001	
Styria; Ilz	8262 Ilz 1; 47.0878°N 15.9259°E	James the Great Church Ilz	painting St. Michael on organ loft	יהדה		
Styria; Judenburg	8750 Judenburg; Kirchenplatz 2; 47.1682°N 14.6619°E	St. Nicholas Church Judenburg	fresco above the altar of All-Saints-Chapel	הTיה	ca. 1690	
Styria; Leoben	8700 Leoben-Göß; Stift 8; 47.3632°N 15.0959°E	St. Andrew's Church, Göss Abbey	on top of the former Abbey Church's main altar. artist: Franz Kunst	יהדה	1792	
Styria; Lobmingtal	8734 Großlobming; Murweg 1; 47.1865°N 14.8084°E	St. Lambert's Church Großlobming	pulpit	יהוה	ca. 1800	
Styria; Maria Lankowitz	8591 Maria Lankowitz; Hauptstraße 174; 47.0642°N 15.0623°E	Pilgrimage Church of Virgin Mary's Visitation, Maria Lankowitz	St. Zechariah statue on right side of main altar. artist: Veit Königer	וחדח	1767	
Styria; Mariazell	8630 Mariazell; Benedictus-Platz 1; 47.7729°N 15.3184°E	Mariazell Basilica	above the main altar	יהוה	ca. 1700	
Styria; Mariazell	8632 Gußwerk; Brandhof 1; 47.6334°N 15.3011°E	Brandhof hunting lodge	on chapel's glass window	יהוה	ca. 1825	
Styria; Murau	8850 Murau; Marktgasse; 47.1102°N 14.1671°E	Elisabeth's Church Murau (Protestant)	on top of pulpit altar	והוה	1827	
Styria; Neumarkt in der Steiermark	8820 St. Marein bei Neumarkt; Pöllau; 47.0386°N 14.3859°E	St. Leonhard's Church in Pöllau bei St. Marein	above the main altar. artist: Johann Reiter?	יהוה	ca. 1780	
Styria; Pischelsdorf am Kulm	8212 Pischelsdorf am Kulm 25; 47.1741°N 15.8056°E	St. Peter and Paul Church Pischelsdorf am Kulm	on top of left side altar	יהדה	1730	
Styria; Pischelsdorf am Kulm	8212 Pischelsdorf am Kulm 25; 47.1741°N 15.8056°E	St. Peter and Paul Church Pischelsdorf am Kulm	on left wall of Chancel	יהדה		
Styria; Pöllau	8225 Pöllau; Schloss 1; 47.3024°N 15.8341°E	St. Vitus' Church Pöllau	on top of right side altar	יהד		
Styria; Pöllau	8225 Pöllau; Schloss 1; 47.3024°N 15.8339°E	St. Vitus' Church Pöllau	on ceiling of right side chapel. covered by luster mounting.	(covered)		
Styria; Pöllau	8225 Pöllau; Schönau; 47.2580°N 15.8587°E	war memorial Schönegg				
Styria; Radmer	8795 Radmer an der Stube 35; 47.5459°N 14.7606°E	Saint Anthony of Padua Church Radmer	painting Johann Adalbert Prevenhuber's children, on church's left back wall	יהוה	ca. 1810	
Styria; Sankt Gallen	8933 St. Gallen; Kirchenviertel 25; 47.6924°N 14.6158°E	St. Gallus Church	on altar piece of left side altar, by Bartolomeo Altomonte	יהוה	ca. 1750	
Styria; Sankt Lambrecht	8813 St. Lambrecht; Hauptstraße 1; 47.0722°N 14.3001°E	St. Lambert's Abbey	on Holy Tomb, established only in Holy Week in St.-Mary's-Chapel in left side of Abbey's Church	יהוה	ca. 1890	
Styria; Sankt Martin am Wöllmißberg	8580 St. Martin am Wöllmißberg 8; 47.0107°N 15.1037°E	St. Martin's Church am Wöllmißberg	on top of right side altar (Saint Anthony's altar)	יהדה	1684	
Styria; Sankt Peter am Kammersberg	8843 St. Peter am Kammersberg 81; 47.1872°N 14.1862°E	St. Peter's Church am Kammersberg	painting St. Michael and the Fall of the Rebel Angels: on St. Michael's shield	יחדה	ca. 1740	
Styria; Sankt Peter ob Judenburg	8755 St. Peter ob Judenburg; Hauptstraße 31; 47.1859°N 14.5869°E	St. Peter's Church ob Judenburg	above the main altar	הוהS	ca. 1800	
Styria; Sankt Veit in der Südsteiermark	8423 St. Veit am Vogau; Am Kirchplatz; 46.7471°N 15.6257°E	St. Vitus Church in Südsteiermark	altarpiece of St. Nepomuk's altar (right side of church)	דהדה		
Styria; Sankt Veit in der Südsteiermark	8423 St. Veit am Vogau; Am Kirchplatz; 46.7472°N 15.6255°E	St. Vitus Church in Südsteiermark	St. Zechariah statue on left side altar	Πיהד		
Styria; Sankt Veit in der Südsteiermark	8423 St. Veit am Vogau; Am Kirchplatz; 46.7474°N 15.6258°E	St. Vitus Church in Südsteiermark	on painting on right side of sanctuary. faded, only partly readable			
Styria; Seckau	8732 Seckau 1; 47.2746°N 14.7872°E	Seckau Abbey	on Basilica's portal. artist: Bernward Schmid	יהוה	1994	
Styria; Sinabelkirchen	8261 Sinabelkirchen; Gnies 143; 47.0878°N 15.9259°E	St. Oswald of Northumbria Church Gnies	on altarpiece of left side altar (Saint Notburga altar)	דהוה	1741	
Styria; Teufenbach-Katsch	8833 Teufenbach-Katsch; Kirchgasse; 47.1313°N 14.3630°E	Mortuary Teufenbach	artist: Rudolf Hirt	יהוה	2004	
Styria; Thal	8051 Thal; Am Kirchberg 1; 47.0764°N 15.3617°E	St. Jacob's Church, Thal	inside the church, above the main entrance. artist: Ernst Fuchs	יהוה	1992	
Styria; Thal	8051 Thal; Am Kirchberg 1; 47.0762°N 15.3617°E	St. Jacob's Church, Thal	on baptismal font. artist: Ernst Fuchs	יהוה	1992	
Styria; Thannhausen	8160 Weiz near Alterilz 85; 47.2276°N 15.6872°E	Wayside Chapel Alterilz	ceiling fresco	יהוה	renovated 1981	
Styria; Voitsberg	8570 Voitsberg; Oberdorferstraße 12b 47.0585°N 15.1384°E	Voitsberg mortuary	inside mortuary	יהדה	2007	
Styria; Vorau	8250 Vorau 1; 47.4010°N 15.8899°E	Vorau Abbey Church	on top of Altar Of The Cross (on right side of church)	דדמו	1697	
Styria; Vorau	8250 Vorau 1; 47.4010°N 15.8897°E	Vorau Abbey Church	on ceiling fresco above the pipe organ	דהדה		
Styria; Vorau	8250 Vorau 1; 47.4012°N 15.8897°E	Vorau Abbey Church: Sacristy	on ceiling fresco in Sacristy: on forehead of High Priest, and of another Jewish priest. artist: Johann Cyriac Hackhofer.		1715	
Styria; Vorau	8250 Vorau 3; 47.4016°N 15.8861°E	Holy Cross Church (Cemetery Church) Vorau	on top of main altar	יחיח	ca. 1760	
Styria; Vorau	8250 Vorau; Kringstraße; 47.4033°N 15.9017°E	wayside chapel, Vorau	front	יהוה (faded)	1750	
Styria; Vorau	8250 Vorau 1; 47.4008°N 15.8901°E	Vorau Abbey Library	on head of statue on left side of library portal	יהדה		
Styria; Weiz	8160 Weiz; Weizberg 13; 47.2242°N 15.6356°E	Our Lady of Sorrows Basilica Weizberg	above the pulpit, made by Jacob Payer	יחדח	1775	
Styria; Weiz	8160 Weiz; Weizberg 13; 47.2241°N 15.6356°E	Our Lady of Sorrows Basilica Weizberg	in ceiling fresco, made by Joseph Adam von Mölk	יחדח	1771	
Tyrol; Absam	6067 Absam; Dörferstraße 55a 47.2956°N 11.5014°E	Saint Michael's Church Absam	ceiling fresco. artist: Josef Anton Zoller	יחוח	1779	
Tyrol; Anras	9912 Anras; Dorf 35; 46.7725°N 12.5564°E	Saint Stephen's Church Anras	on altarpiece of right side altar: Michael fighting against the devil. artist: Anton Zoller.	וחוח	1756	
Tyrol; Assling	9911 Mittewald 141; 46.7726°N 12.6042°E	Old John the Baptist Church Mittewald	painting "Saint Margarete" on wing of altarpiece.	יהוה	1603	
Tyrol; Breitenwang	6600 Breitenwang; Planseestraße 49; 47.4885°N 10.7275°E	Resurection Chapel Breitenwang	ceiling fresco. artist: Paul Zeiller.	יחוח	1725	
Tyrol; Elmen	6644 Elmen; 47.34044°N 10.54191°E	Three Kings Church Elmen	altar painting of right side altar: 12 years old Jesus in Temple. large tetragrammaton on top of the painting; small tetragrammaton on priest's plate. artist: Josef Anton Knöpfle.	יהוה	1802	
Tyrol; Flirsch	6572 Flirsch47.1485°N 10.4080°E	Saint Bartholomy Church Flirsch	on top of main altar.	יהוה		
Tyrol; Innsbruck	6020 Innsbruck; Karl-Rahner-Platz 2; 47.2687°N 11.3981°E	Holy Trinity Church Innsbruck (Jesuits Church)	in cuppola	יהוה		
Tyrol; Innsbruck	6020 Innsbruck; Karl-Rahner-Platz 2; 47.2687°N 11.3980°E	Holy Trinity Church Innsbruck (Jesuits Church)	altarpiece of Jude the Apostle altar: on Tablets of the Law. artist: Andreas Wolf		1684	The Tetragrammaton was located on the altarpiece of the altar of Jude the Apostle, associated with the Tablets of the Law and created by the artist Andreas Wolf. This depiction was removed before August 2024 and no longer exists today.
Tyrol; Innsbruck	6020 Innsbruck; Kaiserjägerstraße 6; 47.2700°N 11.4002°E	Saint Francisci Church Innsbruck (Capuchin Church)	altarpiece of main altar. artist: Cosimo Piazza.	יהוה	1606	
Tyrol; Lechaschau	6600 Lechaschau; Lechtaler Straße 2; 47.4884°N 10.7084°E	Holy Ghost Church Lechaschau	ceiling fresco. artist: Jakob Zeiller	יהוה	ca. 1773	
Tyrol; Matrei in Osttirol	9971 Matrei in Osttirol; Kirchplatz 1; 47.0004°N 12.5417°E	Saint Alban's Church Matrei in Osttirol	on ceiling fresco above the main altar: adoration of the Name of God	יהוה		
Tyrol; Mieming	6414 Obermieming; 47.3009°N 10.9860°E	Saint George's Church Obermieming	in triangle on top of main altar	יהוה		
Tyrol; Mils near Hall	6068 Mils bei Hall in Tirol; Kirchstraße 1; 47.2884°N 11.5330°E	Saint Mary of the Assumption Church Mils bei Hall	above the pulpit	וודדד	ca. 1800	
Tyrol; Oetz	6433 Oetz; Dorfstraße 12; 47.2035°N 10.8980°E	house	fresco Franciscus Xaverius on facade	יהוה	1795	
Tyrol; Pettneu am Arlberg	6574 Pettneu am Arlberg; 47.1476°N 10.3394°E	Saint Mary of the Assumption Church Pettneu am Arlberg	on Holy Sepulchre, established in the church in the Holy Week	יהוה	ca. 1900	
Tyrol; Rattenberg	6240 Rattenberg; Bienerstraße 87; 47.4392°N 11.8944°E	Saint Virgil's Church in Rattenberg	on top of the main altar	יהוה		
Tyrol; Reith im Alpbachtal	6235 Reith im Alpbachtal; Dorf 5; 47.4171°N 11.8779°E	Saint Peter's Church Reith im Alpbachtal	on left side altar's altarpiece ("Virgin Mary"). artist: Joseph Schöpf.	יהוה	1800	
Tyrol; Rinn	6074 Rinn; Dorfstraße; 47.24935°N 11.50195°E	Saint Andrew's Church Rinn	ceiling fresco "Judgement of St. Andrew". artist: Josef and Franz Giner.	ביחב	1776	
Tyrol; Schwaz	6130 Schwaz; Tannenberggasse 15; 47.3468°N 11.7099°E	Saint Mary of the Assumption Church in Schwaz	on painting St. Peter and Paul		18th century	
Tyrol; Schwaz	6130 Schwaz; Hermann-von-Gilm-Straße 1; 47.3440°N 11.7109°E	Franciscan Church in Schwaz	on top of Holy Cross altar (right side altar)	יהיה		
Tyrol; Schwaz	6130 Schwaz; Winterstellergasse 9; 47.3466°N 11.7118°E	Rabalder House	on painting Daniel und Barbara mit Ansicht von Schwaz. artist: F. Degle	יהדה	1762	
Tyrol; Söll	6306 Söll; Dorf 1; 47.5035°N 12.1927°E	Saint Peter and Paul Church Söll	ceiling fresco above the main altar. artist: Christoph Anton Mayr	והדו	1768	
Tyrol; Stams	6422 Stams; Stiftshof 1; 47.2777°N 10.9845°E	Abbey Church of Our Lady Stams	On ceiling fresco in the chancel area. artist: Egid Schor	יהדדד	Heinrich Hammer (1912), Die Entwicklung der barocken Deckenmalerei in Tirol, p. 136–139.	
Tyrol; Stams	6422 Stams; Stiftshof 1; 47.2777°N 10.9845°E	Abbey Church of Our Lady Stams	on Holy Sepulchre, established in the church in the Holy Week.	חודדד	Heinrich Hammer, 1912, p. 110. Il indique qu'Egid Schor reçoit, le 3 avril 1670, un acompte de 15 florins « wegen des grabes » — pour le Saint-Sépulcre	
Tyrol; Stans	6135 Stans; Sankt Georgenberg; 47.3764°N 11.6924°E	Pilgrimage Church Sankt Georgenberg	on painting Marriage of the Virgin: on high priest's forehead	יהדה		
Tyrol; Stanzach	6642 Stanzach; Dorf 22; 47.3833°N 10.5619°E	St. Michael's Church Stanzach	Holy Sepulchre, established in church in Holy Week	יהוה	ca. 1890	
Tyrol; Strass im Zillertal	6200 Strass im Zillertal; Rotholz 46; 47.3905°N 11.7971°E	Rotholz Castle	ceiling fresco of castle chapel. artist: Johann Josef Waldmann	יהוה	1706	
Tyrol; Stumm	6275 Stumm; Dorf 15a 47.2906°N 11.8866°E	Saint Rupertus Church Stumm	ceiling fresco behind main altar	דווד		
Tyrol; Tannheim	6675 Tannheim; Höf 34; 47.4992°N 10.5169°E	St. Nicholas Church Tannheim	on altarpiece of Holy Cross Altar (left side altar). artist: Paul Zeiller.	יחדח	1730	
Tyrol; Tannheim	6675 Tannheim; Höf 34; 47.4992°N 10.5168°E	St. Nicholas Church Tannheim	glass window behind main altar	יהוה		
Tyrol; Thaur	6065 Thaur; Schlossgasse; 47.3011°N 11.4682°E	Saints Peter and Paul Pilgrimage Church Thaur ("Romedi Church", "Castle Church")	ceiling fresco above the high altar. artists: Joseph and Franz Giner	ווודח	1779	
Tyrol; Thiersee	6335 Thiersee; Landl; 47.5885°N 12.0347°E	Mary Help Church Landl	painting on main altar, by Sebastian Anton Defregger		ca. 1820	
Tyrol; Virgen	9972 Virgen near Virgentalstraße 90; 47.0035°N 12.4575°E	Cemetery Virgen	gravestone of a Catholic priest on south side of church. Hebrew inscription: "May the name of JHWH be praised" (Book of Job 1,21).	יהוה	1616	
Tyrol; Volders	6111 Volders; Vorderwaldstraße 3; 47.2828°N 11.5536°E	Saint Charles Church (former Monastery Church) Volders	on top of main altar			
Tyrol; Vomp	6134 Vomp; Fiecht 5; 47.3548°N 11.6960°E	Fiecht Abbey Church	ceiling fresco: on high priest's forehead	יהוה		
Tyrol; Wängle	6610 Wängle47.4869°N 10.6900°E	St. Martin's Church Wängle	ceiling fresco: on high priest's head plate. artist: Franz Anton Zeiller.	יהוה	1786	
Upper Austria; Adlwang	4541 Adlwang; Kirchenplatz 1; 47.9920°N 14.2164°E	Adlwang Church	altarpiece of Adlwang church side altar: on high priest's head plate	ח(faded)	ca. 1730	
Upper Austria; Attnang-Puchheim	4800 Attnang-Puchheim; Attnang, Kirchenstraße 8; 48.0134°N 13.7231°E	Holy Ghost Church Attnang	glass window above main altar. artist: Lucia Jirgall	יהוה	1976	
Upper Austria; Bad Goisern	4822 Bad Goisern; Ramsaustraße 6; 47.6389°N 13.6170°E	Lutheran Church Bad Goisern	on altar	יהוה		
Upper Austria; Baumgartenberg	4345 Baumgartenberg 1; 48.2083°N 14.7434°E	Assumption Church Monastery Baumgartenberg	on top of main altar	יהוה	ca. 1700	
Upper Austria; Braunau am Inn	5280 Braunau am Inn; Kirchenplatz 18; 48.2574°N 13.0339°E	Saint Stephen's Church Braunau	ceiling of Maurer chapel (Mariahilf chapel)	דה דה		
Upper Austria; Enns	4410 Enns; Schlossgasse 4; 48.2155°N 14.4817°E	Ennsegg Castle	ceiling fresco in castle chapel. artist: Carpoforo Tencalla?	דהדה	2nd half of 17th century	
Upper Austria; Fischlham	4652 Fischlham; Kirchenstraße 7; 48.0868°N 13.9523°E	Saint Peter's Church Fischlham	pulpit. artist: Franz Xaver Leithner	דהדה	1759	
Upper Austria; Gaspoltshofen	4674 Altenhof am Hausruck 18; 48.1368°N 13.6877°E	St. Coloman's Church Altenhof am Hausruck	ceiling fresco	יהוה		
Upper Austria; Gaspoltshofen	4674 Gaspoltshofen, Hauptstraße; 48.1436°N 13.7358°E	St. Lawrence's Church Gaspoltshofen	on top of main altar	יחוח		
Upper Austria; Grünbach	4264 Grünbach; 48.5381°N 14.5339°E	St. Nicholas' Church Grünbach	on tabernacle. artists: Frank and Margarete Geffke	יהוה	2007	
Upper Austria; Kremsmünster	4550 Kremsmünster; Stift 1; 48.0546°N 14.1287°E	Christ the Savious and Saint Agapitus of Palestrina Church / Kremsmünster Abbey Church	ceiling fresco above main altar. artists: brothers Grabenberger	יהוה	ca. 1690	
Upper Austria; Lambach	4650 Lambach; Klosterplatz 1; 48.0908°N 13.8772°E	Assumption of Mary Church / Lambrecht Abbey Church	in ceiling fresco above one of the left side altars. Artist: Melchior Steidl(?)	דהדה	ca. 1656	
Upper Austria; Lambach	4650 Lambach; Klosterplatz 1; 48.0908°N 13.8773°E	Assumption of Mary Church / Lambrecht Abbey Church	in ceiling fresco. Artist: Melchior Steidl(?)	דהדה	ca. 1656	
Upper Austria; Maria Neustift	4443 Maria Neustift; 47.9349°N 14.6015°E	Maria Neustift, Schüssleder wayside chapel	on front of wayside chapel	יהוה	ca. 2015	
Upper Austria; Mondsee	5310 Mondsee; Marktplatz; 47.8565°N 13.3512°E	Mondsee Abbey Church	on Holy Tomb, established only in Holy Week in St. Peter's chapel in left side of Abbey's Church	יהוה	ca. 1890	
Upper Austria; Ohlsdorf	4662 Ohlsdorf; Hauptstraße 18; 47.9605°N 13.7924°E	St. Martin's Church Ohlsdorf	main altar.	יהוה	circa 1690	
Upper Austria; Putzleinsdorf	4134 Putzleinsdorf; Bründl 1; 48.5222°N 13.8791°E	Maria Bründl Church	painting on church gallery, on priest's forehead	Π,T,		
Upper Austria; Reichersberg	4981 Reichersberg; Hofmark 1; 48.3374°N 13.3608°E	Reichersberg Abbey Church	ceiling fresco. artist: Christian Wink.	יהדה	1778	
Upper Austria; Reichersberg	4981 Reichersberg; Hofmark 1; 48.3374°N 13.3607°E	Reichersberg Abbey Church		(faded)	ca. 1770	
Upper Austria; Reichraming	4462 Reichraming near Dirnbachstraße 4; 47.87726°N 14.45107°E	Dirnberg Chapel		דהד		
Upper Austria; Sankt Florian	4490 St. Florian; Stiftstraße 1; 48.2072°N 14.3887°E	St. Florian Monastery Church	ceiling fresco above the pipe organ. artists: Johannes Anton Gumpp, Melchior Steidl	דהדה	1690–1695	
Upper Austria; Sankt Florian	4490 St. Florian; Stiftstraße 1; 48.2073°N 14.3888°E	St. Florian Monastery Church	ceiling fresco of St. Augustinus chapel	דהדה	ca. 1700	
Upper Austria; Schlierbach	4553 Schlierbach; Klosterstraße 1; 47.9362°N 14.1268°E	Schlierbach Abbey Church	fresco in Schlierbach abbey church: on high priest's head plate	ח(faded)	ca. 1680	
Upper Austria; Stadl-Paura	4651 Stadl-Paura; Johann-Michael-Prunner-Straße 7; 48.0861°N 13.8640°E	Holy Trinity Church Stadl-Paura	above main altar	יהוה	1724	
Upper Austria; Steyr	4400 Steyr; Brucknerplatz; 48.0375°N 14.4169°E	St. Giles and Coloman Church Steyr	relief St. Job, on epitaph inside the church, left of main entrance			
Upper Austria; Steyr	4400 Steyr; Stadtplatz 41; 48.0383°N 14.4192°E	St. Mary's Church Steyr	on front facade gable	יהוה	ca. 1775	
Upper Austria; Steyr	4400 Steyr; Michaelerplatz 1; 48.0436°N 14.4214°E	St. Michael's Church Steyr	on painting Nine Orders of Angels, on nave's right side. artist: Maria Catharina Gürtler	דהדה	1769	
Vienna	1010 Vienna; Am Hof 1; 48.2110°N 16.3684°E	Nine Choirs of Angels' Church Am Hof	above the St. Gabriel's statue on right side of triumphal arch	יהוה		
Vienna	1010 Vienna; Dorotheergasse 20; 48.2069°N 16.3687°E	Reformed City Church Vienna	above pulpit	יהוה		
Vienna	1010 Vienna; Herrengasse 13; 48.21°N 16.3647°E	Palais Niederösterreich	altarpiece. artist: Carl Geyling.	ה	1846	
Vienna	1010 Vienna; Hofburg 1; 48.2066°N 16.3654°E	Imperial Treasury, Vienna	altar Annunciation to the shepherds	יהוה	ca. 1600	
Vienna	1010 Vienna; In der Burg; 48.2079°N 16.3640°E	St. Joseph's Chapel, Hofburg	above altar	וחוח		
Vienna	1010 Vienna; Maria-Theresien-Platz; 48.2037°N 16.3618°E	Kunsthistorisches Museum	on Wallenstein's amulet	יהוה	ca. 1600-1610	
Vienna	1010 Vienna; Michaelerplatz 5; 48.2080°N 16.3670°E	Church of Saint Michael, Vienna	on shield of St. Michael's sculpture, above church's main entrance. artist: Lorenzo Matielli	יהוה	ca. 1725	
Vienna	1010 Vienna; Michaelerplatz 5; 48.2079°N 16.3676°E	Church of Saint Michael, Vienna	on shield of St. Michael's relief, above main altar. artist: Carl Melville	יהוה	1782	
Vienna	1010 Vienna; Minoritenplatz 2a 48.2096°N 16.3639°E	Minoritenkirche (Vienna)	on painting of Carl Borromäus and Rochus. artist: Johannes Steiner	יהוה	ca. 1781	
Vienna	1010 Vienna; Petersplatz 1; 48.2096°N 16.3702°E	Peterskirche, Vienna	above main altar	יהוה		
Vienna	1010 Vienna; Petersplatz 1; 48.2094°N 16.3701°E	Peterskirche, Vienna	above St. Michael's altar	יהדד		
Vienna	1010 Vienna; Petersplatz 1; 48.2095°N 16.3703°E	Peterskirche, Vienna	in a room above sacristy	הוה		
Vienna	1010 Vienna; Schottengasse 3; 48.2122°N 16.3630°E	Assumption Chapel of Melkerhof	fresco Concert of Angels, above the chapel's gallery, painted by Johann Baptist Wenzel Bergl	יהוה	1773	
Vienna	1010 Vienna; Schulhof 2; 48.2109°N 16.3693°E	Vienna Clock Museum	on pocket watch, in museum's 3rd floor	Tיהד	18th century	
Vienna	1010 Vienna; Seitenstettengasse 4; 48.2116°N 16.3748°E	Stadttempel (Vienna Main Synagogue)	inscription (Psalm 16) above the Tablets of the Law	יהוה	19th century	
Vienna	1010 Vienna; Singerstraße 7; 48.2076°N 16.3733°E	Church of the Teutonic Order, Vienna	epitaph of Erasmus Christoph Graf Starhemberg	יהוה	1729	
Vienna	1010 Vienna; Singerstraße 7; 48.2076°N 16.3733°E	Church of the Teutonic Order, Vienna	epitaph of Guidobald Graf Starhemberg	יהוה	1737	
Vienna	1010 Vienna; Stephansplatz 1; 48.2088°N 16.3727°E	St. Stephen's Cathedral, Vienna	on epitaph, left of main portal	יהוה	ca. 1572	
Vienna	1040 Vienna; Karlsplatz 10; 48.1981°N 16.3720°E	Karlskirche	above main altar	יהוה	ca. 1735	
Vienna	1060 Vienna; Barnabitengasse 14; 48.1991°N 16.3534°E	Barnabites Monastery, Vienna	ceiling fresco of Salvator hall. artist: Vinzenz Fischer	יהוה	1770	
Vienna	1080 Vienna; Alser Straße 17; 48.2145°N 16.3528°E	Trinity Church Alser Suburb	on top of main altar	יהוה	ca. 1740	
Vienna	1090 Vienna; Marktgasse 40; 48.2274°N 16.3579°E	Fourteen Holy Helpers' Church Lichtental	ceiling fresco Hallowed be Your Name. artist: Franz Zoller	יווה	ca. 1772	
Vienna	1090 Vienna; Rooseveltplatz; 48.2153°N 16.3592°E	Votivkirche, Vienna	on top of back of left aisle	יהוה	ca. 1855	
Vienna	1110 Vienna; Kobelgasse; 48.1695°N 16.4226°E	St. Lawrence's Church Alt-Simmering	on top of main altar	יהה		
Vienna	1140 Vienna; Hüttelbergstraße 26; 48.2097°N 16.2558°E	Otto Wagner Villa I	on ceiling of Blue Saloon. artist: Ernst Fuchs	יחוה		
Vienna	1150 Vienna; Reindorfgasse 21; 48.1897°N 16.3302°E	Trinity Church Reindorf	on top of main altar	יחוה	ca. 1790	
Vienna	1190 Vienna; Am Leopoldsberg; 48.2779°N 16.3469°E	Leopoldsberg Church	on top of main altar. artist: Adam Vogl	יהוה	1797	
Vienna	1190 Vienna; Josefsdorf 18; 48.2750°N 16.3382°E	former Camaldolese cell	ceiling fresco of prayer room. faded, only small parts readable anymore.		1775	
Vienna	1190 Vienna; Eyblergasse 1; 48.2506°N 16.30339°E	Saint Roch Church Neustift am Walde	on top of main altar.	יהוה	1786	
Vorarlberg; Au	6883 Au; 47.3238°N 9.9769°E	Saint Leonard's Church Au	ceiling fresco Vorarlbergia sancta. artist: Waldemar Kolmsperger	ידוד	1923	
Vorarlberg; Bregenz	6900 Bregenz; Mariahilfstraße 49; 47.4954°N 9.7274°E	Mariahilf Church Bregenz	stained glass window Annunciation. artist: Anton Faistauer	יהדה	1931	
Vorarlberg; Hohenems	6845 Hohenems; Kirchplatz 2; 47.3636°N 9.6903°E	Saint Charles Church Hohenems	above main altar	יהוה		
Vorarlberg; Sankt Gallenkirch	6791 Sankt Gallenkirch 3; 47.0204°N 9.9740°E	Saint Gall Church St. Gallenkirch	ceiling fresco in entry hall. artist: Christoph Klausner	יהיה	1774	

The following objects contain Hebrew or Pseudo-Hebrew characters on positions where an observer would anticipate to find the Tetragrammaton, but the spelling does not even resemble the Tetragrammaton יהוה in appearance:

state of Austria, municipality	address / coordinates	building	object, description	spelling	work date	image
Carinthia; Greifenburg	9761 Greifenburg near Pfarrhofgasse 35; 46.7512°N 13.1813°E	Greifenburg Church	stations of the cross: on priest's forehead			
Carinthia; Lesachtal	9655 Maria Luggau 26; 46.7054°N 12.7358°E	Pilgrimage Church Maria Luggau	ceiling fresco Presentation of Jesus in the Temple: on priest's forehead			
Carinthia; Sankt Georgen am Längsee	9313 St. Georgen am Längsee; Schlossallee 2; 46.7811°N 14.4304°E	Former Abbey Church Sankt Georgen am Längsee	painting Burial of Jesus in the Temple at main altar: on man's forehead			
Lower Austria; Sankt Egyden am Steinfeld	2731 St. Egyden am Steinfeld; Kirchenplatz; 47.7813°N 16.1022°E	Saint Giles Church St. Egyden am Steinfeld	painting Station of the Cross IX: on priest's forehead			
Styria; Ardning	8904 Ardning; Frauenberg 1; 47.5842°N 14.3983°E	Frauenberg Basilica	ceiling fresco: on priest's forehead			
Styria; Köflach	8580 Köflach; Herunterplatz; 47.0651°N 15.0851°E	Mary Magdalene Church Köflach	ceiling fresco: on priest's forehead			
Styria; Straden	8345 Straden 1; 46.8059°N 15.8706°E	Church Saint Mary of the Assumption Straden	painting Station of the Cross IX: on priest's forehead			
Styria; Vorau	8250 Vorau 1; 47.4009°N 15.8898°E	Vorau Abbey Church	painting Presentation of Christ in Temple, on forehead of High Priest			
Tyrol; Vomp	6134 Vomp; Fiecht 5; 47.3548°N 11.6959°E	Fiecht Abbey Church	ceiling fresco above the pipe organ: on high priest's forehead			
Upper Austria; Kremsmünster	4550 Kremsmünster; Stift 1; 48.0546°N 14.1286°E	Christ the Savious and Saint Agapitus of Palestrina Church / Kremsmünster Abbey Church	ceiling fresco Annunciation of the Angel to Zechariah. artists: brothers Grabenberger		ca. 1680	
Vienna	1030 Vienna; Rennweg 91; 48.1904°N 16.3980°E	Waisenhaus Church Rennweg	modeled scenes of Christ's childhood: on Jewish priest's forehead			

== Literature ==
- Wolfgang and Carmen Kriegler: Auf Spurensuche in Wien. Vienna, 3rd edition, 2016.
- Wolfgang Kriegler: Auf Spurensuche im Burgenland und in der Steiermark. Vienna, 2nd edition, 2018.
- Wolfgang Kriegler: Auf Spurensuche in Tirol und Vorarlberg. Vienna 2016.
- Wolfgang and Carmen Kriegler: Auf Spurensuche in Niederösterreich. Vienna 2017.
- Wolfgang and Carmen Kriegler: Auf Spurensuche in Salzburg und Oberösterreich. Vienna 2017.
- (Günther Fontane) Der Name Gottes יהוה. Entdeckt in unserer Nähe. Kärnten & Osttirol. Gmünd in Kärnten 2013.
- יהוה. Der Name Gottes in hebräischen Schriftzeichen. Fundstellen im Öffentlichen Raum der Stadt Salzburg. Salzburg 2008.
