= Zissersdorf =

Zisserdorf is the name of the following places:

- Drosendorf-Zissersdorf, Horn District, Lower Austria, Austria
- A cadastral community in Hausleiten, Korneuburg District, Lower Austria, Austria

== See also ==
- Zistersdorf, a town in Gänserndorf, Lower Austria, Austria
