= Aschach =

Aschach may refer to:

- municipalities in Austria:
  - Aschach an der Donau
  - Aschach an der Steyr
- Aschach (river), a river in Austria
