= Innbach =

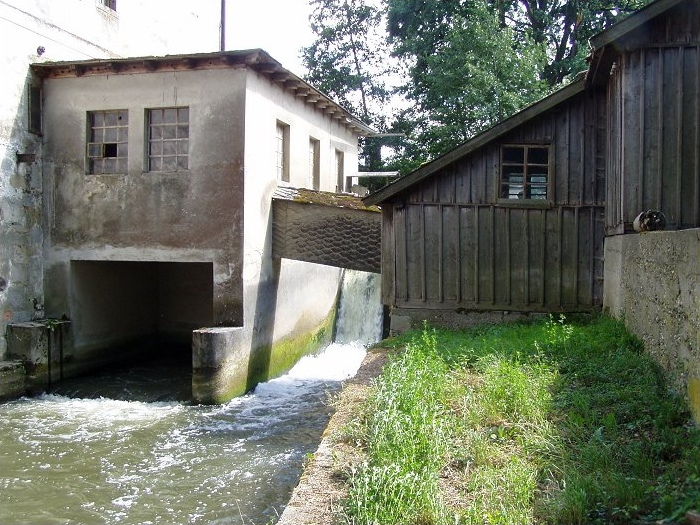
- Wiesmühle in Fraham

Location
- Country: Austria
- State: Upper Austria

Physical characteristics
- Source
  - location: near Gaspoltshofen
- Mouth
  - location: the Danube at Wilhering
  - coordinates: 48.3212°N 14.1609°E
- Length: 58.8 km (36.5 mi)
- Basin size: 196 km^{2} (76 sq mi)

Basin features
- Progression: Danube→ Black Sea

The Innbach is a river in Upper Austria with a length of approximately 59 km (37 mi). Its source is near Gaspoltshofen at the foot of the Hausruck hills and empties into the Danube at Wilhering. Its drainage basin covers 196 km^{2} (76 sq mi). After Gaspoltshofen, the Innbach passes the towns of Kematen am Innbach, Pichl bei Wels and Bad Schallerbach, at the mouth of the Trattnach. Near Eferding, it joins with the Aschach and a few kilometers later flows into the Danube downstream of the Ottensheim-Wilhering Power Station.

Due to its high volume, many mills were once located along the Innbach.

The Innbach is populated with many species of fish, among them: brown trout, brook trout, bullhead, minnow, grayling, gudgeon, rainbow trout, chub, barbel, roach, rudd, spirlin, perch, nase, dace, bleak, carp, bream, burbot, pike, zander, and catfish.
