= Schloss Straßburg =

Castle in Austria

Burg Straßburg
- Carinthia, Austria
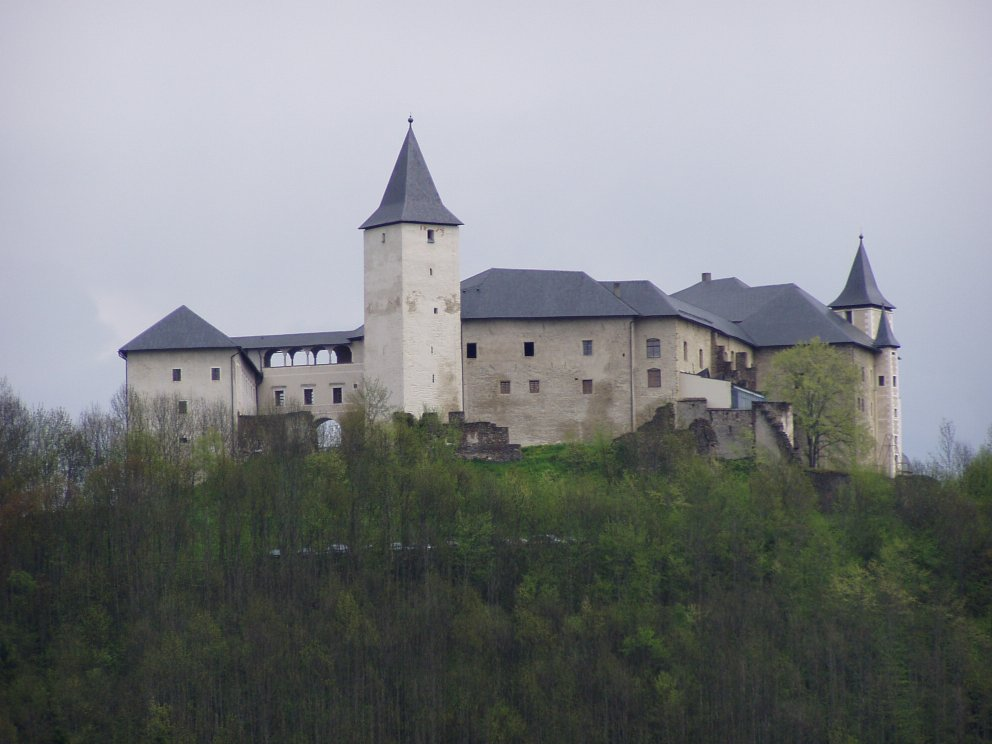

Site information
- Type: Castle

Location
- Location within Kärnten Location within Austria
- Coordinates: 46°53′51″N 14°19′49″E

Schloss Straßburg is a castle in Straßburg, Carinthia, Austria. Schloss Straßburg is 754 metres (2,474 ft) above sea level.

Today, the castle hosts changing museum exhibits and houses several ethnographic collections. On permanent display are objects depicting rural life, including rustic furniture, kitchen gadgets, tools, household equipment, a collection of textiles from the mid-19th to mid-20th centuries, and a collection of smoking pipes.

== See also ==
- List of castles in Austria
