= Herzogenburg =

- Municipality
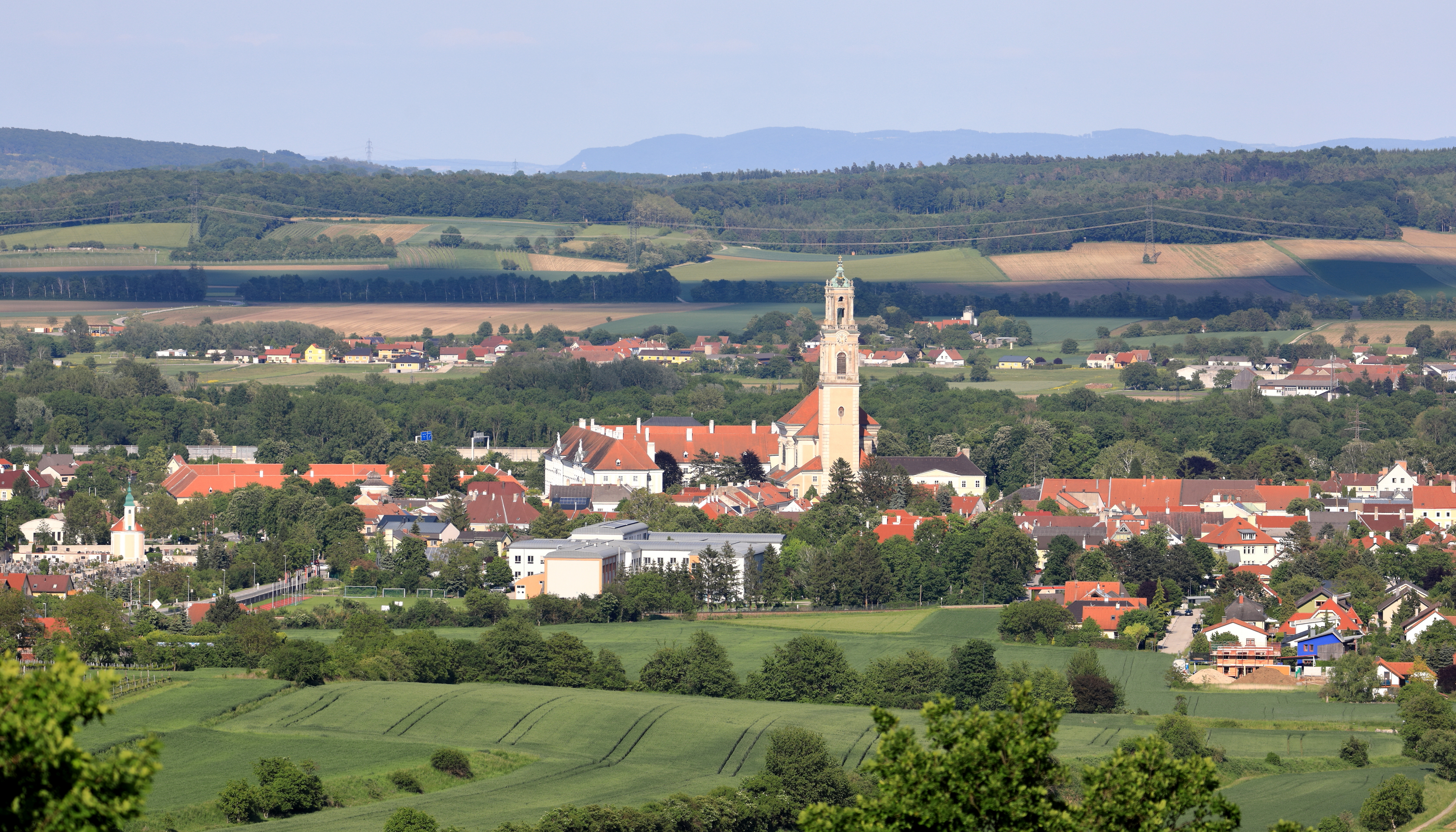
- Herzogenburg seen from west

- Coat of arms

- Location within Austria
- Coordinates: 48°17′N 15°41′E
- Country: Austria
- State: Lower Austria
- District: Sankt Pölten-Land

Government
  - Mayor: Christoph Artner

Area
  - Total: 46.09 km^{2} (17.80 sq mi)
- Elevation: 229 m (751 ft)

Population (2018-01-01)
  - Total: 7,771
  - Density: 168.6/km^{2} (436.7/sq mi)
- Time zone: UTC+1 (CET)
  - Summer (DST): UTC+2 (CEST)
- Postal code: 3130
- Area code: +43 2782
- Website: http://www.herzogenburg.at

Herzogenburg is a town in the district of Sankt Pölten-Land in the Austrian state of Lower Austria.

== Population ==
Historical population
Year	Pop.	±%
1869	4,322	—
1880	4,500	+4.1%
1890	4,768	+6.0%
1900	5,396	+13.2%
1910	6,398	+18.6%
1923	5,935	−7.2%
1934	6,371	+7.3%
1939	6,226	−2.3%
1951	6,437	+3.4%
1961	6,805	+5.7%
1971	7,423	+9.1%
1981	7,299	−1.7%
1991	7,461	+2.2%
2001	7,738	+3.7%
2011	7,828	+1.2%
2016	7,738	−1.1%
