= Aschach (river) =

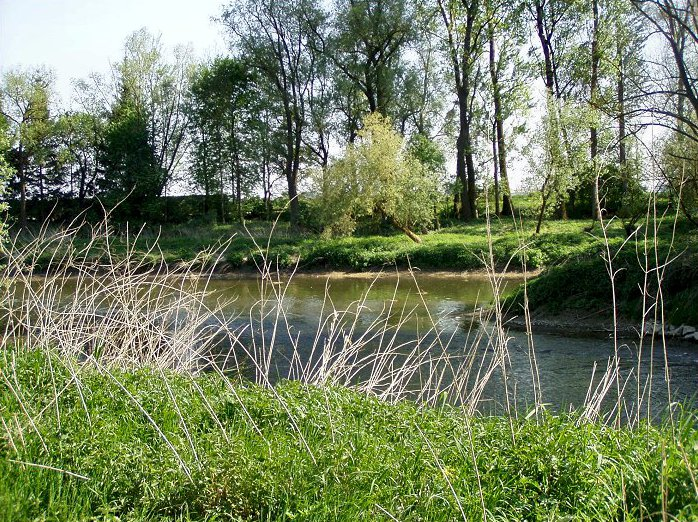
- The Aschach (foreground right) where it joins the Innbach (background right, and left)

Location
- Country: Austria
- State: Upper Austria

Physical characteristics
- Mouth
  - location: Innbach
  - coordinates: 48.3053°N 14.0994°E
- Length: 35.3 km (21.9 mi)

Basin features
- Progression: Innbach→ Danube→ Black Sea

The Aschach is a river of Upper Austria. It is a left tributary of the Innbach near Alkoven.
