= Thal, Styria =

Village in Styria, Austria

Thal
- Municipality
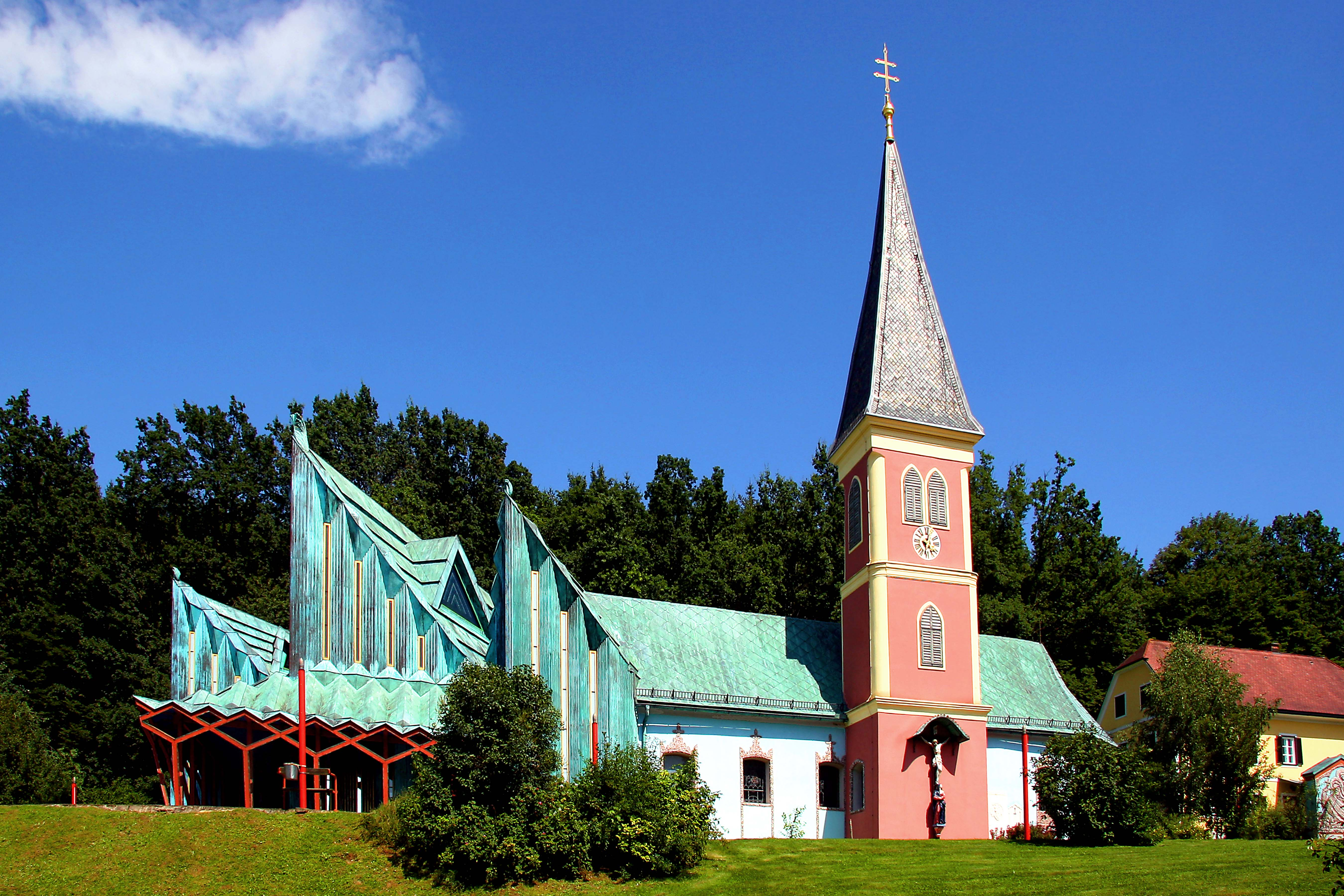
- Thal's local church in July 2009

- Coat of arms

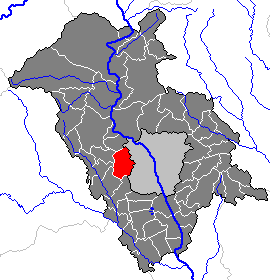
- Location within Graz-Umgebung district

- Location within Austria
- Coordinates: 47°04′42″N 15°21′15″E
- Country: Austria
- State: Styria
- District: Graz-Umgebung

Government
  - Mayor: Matthias Brunner (Bürgerliste)

Area
  - Total: 18.59 km^{2} (7.18 sq mi)
- Elevation: 440 m (1,440 ft)

Population (2018-01-01)
  - Total: 2,261
  - Density: 121.6/km^{2} (315.0/sq mi)
- Time zone: UTC+1 (CET)
  - Summer (DST): UTC+2 (CEST)
- Postal codes: 8051, 8052, 8151
- Area code: 0316
- Vehicle registration: GU
- Website: www.thal.steiermark.at

Thal (German pronunciation: [ˈtaːl]) is a village in the Austrian state of Styria, about 3.2 kilometres (2.0 mi) west from the edge of Graz, Austria's second largest city. Its population in 2014 was 2,240.

Thal is most notably the birthplace of bodybuilder, actor and politician Arnold Schwarzenegger, who lived there until 1966 at the age of 19, when he moved to Munich. In July 2011, Schwarzenegger opened his childhood house as the Arnold Schwarzenegger Museum.

== Toponymy ==
The etymology of the town, which simply means "valley" (now spelled Tal in Standard German; cognate to English dale seen in many placenames) before the German Orthographic Conference of 1901 reforms, is ultimately from a cadet branch of the Graben von Stein, named Von Thal (De Valle in Medieval Latin).

== History ==
Until the 800s AD, the area was unsettled. The first forest village settlement was established in the 10th century. In the following two centuries, scattered hamlets grew up in the area. On 1 January 1850, the settlement became known as "St. Jacob Thal". On 1 January 1895, the village became a settlement with market town ("Marktgemeinde") status.

== Geography ==
The village is located about 3.2 km (2.0 mi) west of the Styrian capital of Graz. Thal is a scattered settlement of houses, consisting of about 19 grouped hamlets: Eben, Eck, Hardt, Haslau, Kirchberg, Kötschberg, Linak, Oberbichl, Oberthal, Plabutsch, Schlüsselhof, Steinberg, Unterbichl, Unterthal, Waldsdorf, Waldsdorfberg, Wendlleiten, Windhof, and Winkel. The village contains a small lake called Thalersee.

== Notable landmarks ==
=== Parish church of St. Jacob ===
In 1735, a wooden chapel was built in Baroque style. In 1772, the parish church of St. Jacob was built and originally dedicated to St. Sebastian. It was extended in 1992, with the foundation stone laid on 23 May 1992 and the church was consecrated on 15 May 1994 by Johann Weber. The extension to the existing church was by the architect Manfred Fuchs Bichler, and the Austrian painter, graphic artist and architect Ernst Fuchs. The artistic design of the entire complex with bright colors and shapes and impressive lighting effects received critical acclaim.

=== Oberthal House ===
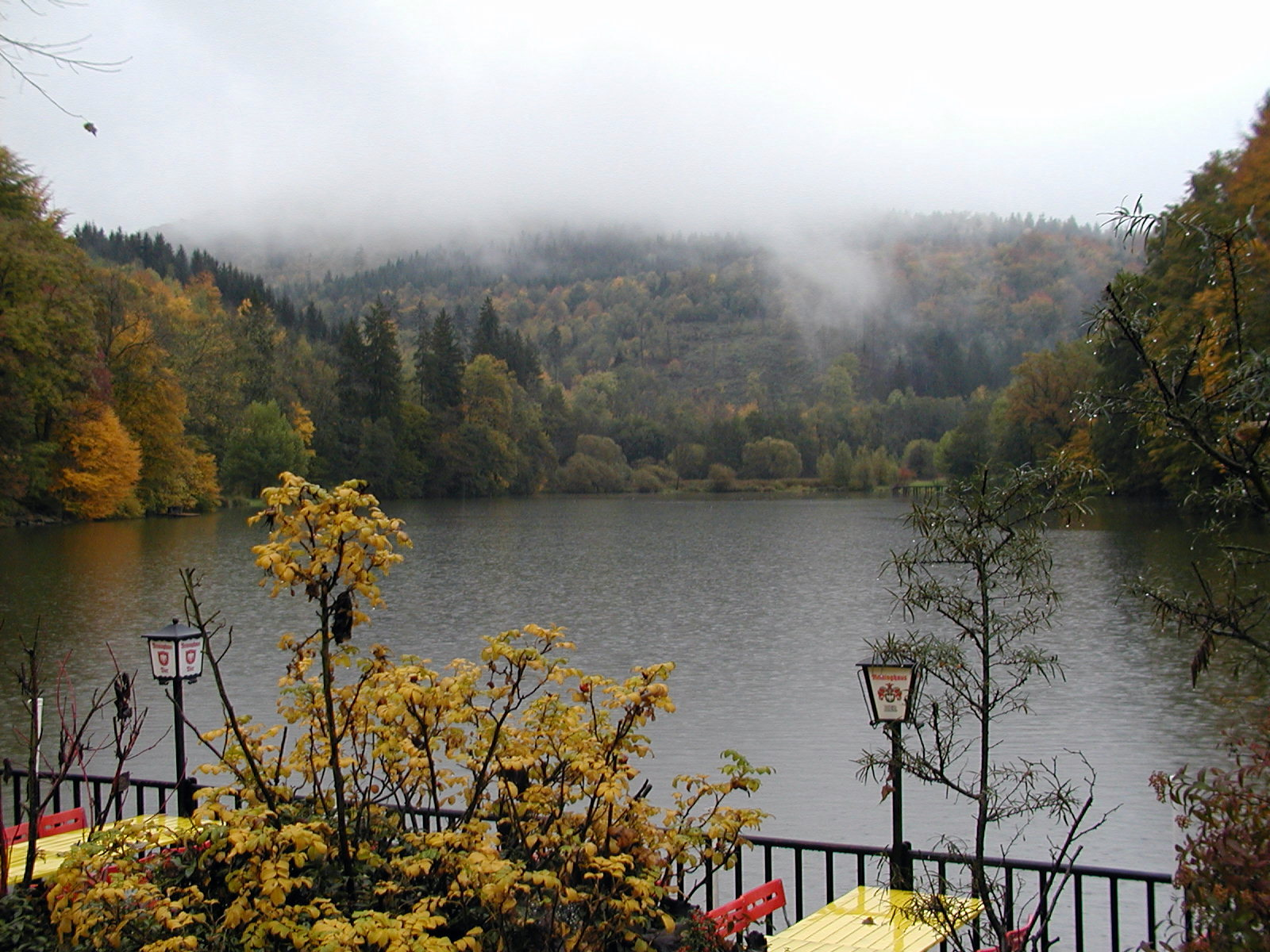
Thalersee, pictured in October 2002

By the 12th century, the lords of Waldsdorf had established their seat on the site of the present stately home in the shape of a fortified manor house with a large dairy farm. From 1315 to 1605, it was owned by the noble family of Windisch-Graetz. In 1563, major conversion and renovation work was carried out on the castle under the then-owner and designer, Erasmus of Windisch-Graetz, which saw it expanded into a Renaissance style stately home with a courtyard surrounded on three sides by three-storey high, columnar arcades. There is still an underground passage, dating to that period, that runs as far as Graz, but it is impassable after the first several hundred metres.

From 1605 to 1622, the house was owned by Bernard Walter of Walthersweil and, from 1622 to 1624, by the Schranz of Schranzenegg family, who sold it to Siegmund Friedrich, Count Trautmannsdorff. During the rule of Sigmund Frederick the Younger of Trautmannsdorff, Oberthal House was converted and expanded between 1656 and 1661 into one of the most splendid in the area around the state capital. Above the house, a large pleasure garden (Lustgarten) was established, based on French prototypes, surrounded by a wall and decorated with grottos and a small maison de plaisance. In 1798, Thal House and its estate was sold to Leopold Edler of Warnhauser and remained in the possession of his family until 1841. From 1841 onwards, the palace was owned by the Freiherren of Walterskirchen. In 1846, the house was remodelled into the Romanesque style of a Scottish castle.

In 1905, Oberthal was sold to a Slovenian consortium, who had to give up the property after a short time for financial reasons. The house subsequently changed hands several times in the ensuing period and steadily fell into a state of dilapidation until it ended up in the hands of Dr. Friedrich Schuster, who had the building repaired again, getting rid of the 1846 modifications and reinstating its original Baroque appearance. In 1940 the house and the estate went to the Essberger family from Hamburg, Germany, owners of the Essberger Shipping company. From 1945 to 1955, the British garrison headquarters was located here, and, from 1955 to 1957, part of the house was rented to the British ambassador. On 1 November 1958, the house was restored to John Theodor Essberger, who died in 1959, whereupon his daughter, Lieselotte von Rantzau inherited it. Frau Liselotte von Rantzau died in 1993, and since such time it has been owned by her sons, Dr. Eberhart and Heinrich von Rantzau.

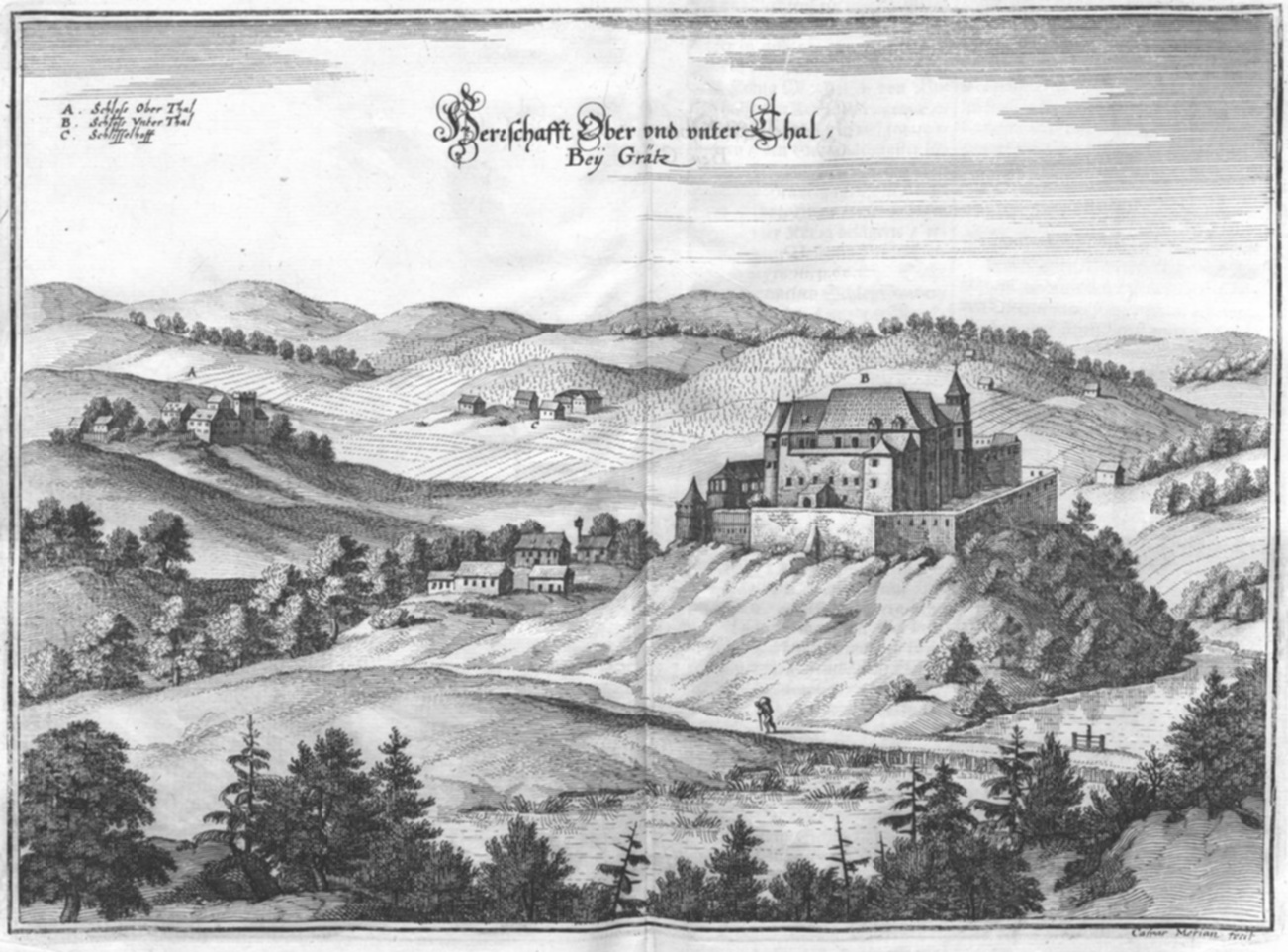
Oberthal and Unterthal Castles (1679)

=== Ruins of Thal Castle ===
Thal Castle was first mentioned in the records in 1259, having been built on a hillock between the present parish church and the lake of Thalersee, probably at the beginning of the 13th century. The castle was surrounded by a thick defensive wall with embrasures and battlement walks (Wehrgänge). Within the wall was the Palas and other residential buildings like the castle church dedicated to St. James. In 1569, Unterthal Castle and the estates of Sebastian of Windisch-Graetz were sold to the Carinthian governor (Landeshauptmann), Georg von Khevenhüller. From 1621, when it was owned by the Eggenberger family, the castle fell into ruins. In 1715, a fire destroyed large parts of the fortress. By around 1750 the castle church had also fallen into ruins. In 1772, the statue of the church patron was ceremoniously transferred to the present parish church and the old church demolished. In the subsequent period, only the round tower was occupied until 1979. In 1996, parts of the castle were restored and made habitable again.

=== Arnold Schwarzenegger Museum ===
Opened in 2011, the museum is located in the former forester's lodge of the Herberstein dynasty. Numerous exhibits show his remarkable career, including his most important stages of life like his childhood and adolescence, becoming the world's best bodybuilder, a worldwide star, and the Governor of California.
