= Rosenburg-Mold =

- Municipality
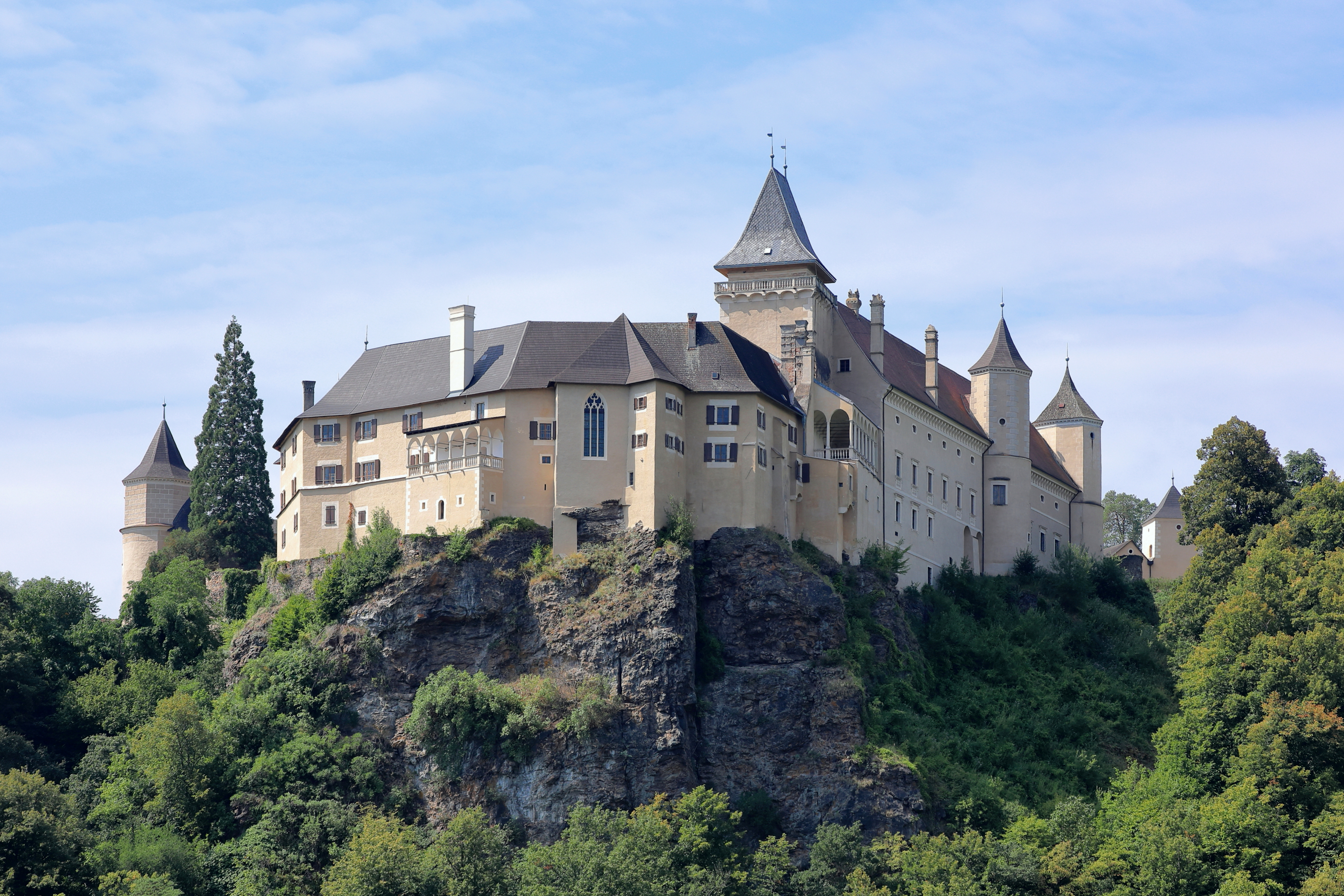
- Rosenburg Castle

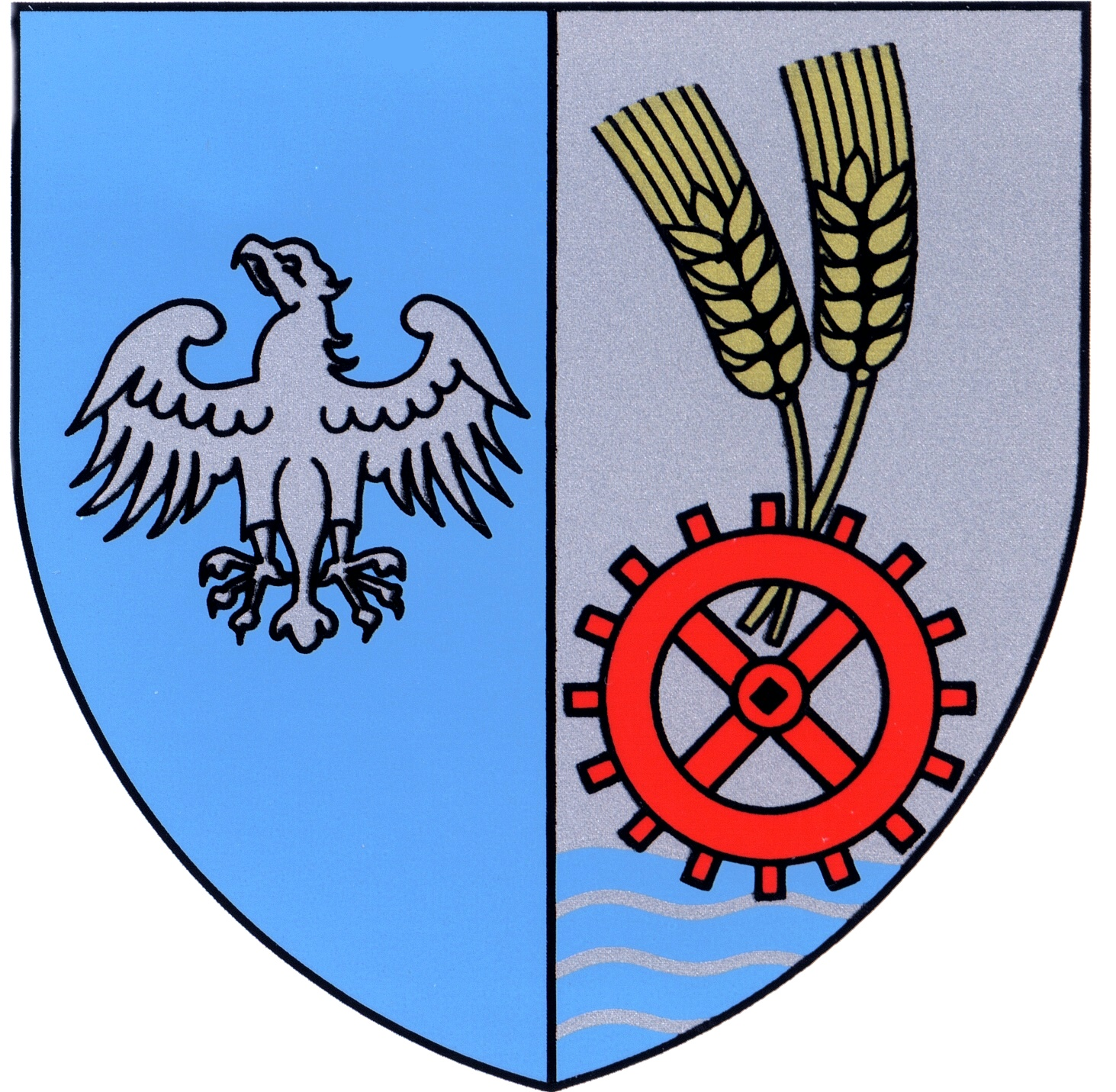
- Coat of arms

- Location within Austria
- Coordinates: 48°37′N 15°40′E
- Country: Austria
- State: Lower Austria
- District: Horn

Government
  - Mayor: Wolfgang Schmöger

Area
  - Total: 30.66 km^{2} (11.84 sq mi)
- Elevation: 268 m (879 ft)

Population (2018-01-01)
  - Total: 856
  - Density: 27.9/km^{2} (72.3/sq mi)
- Time zone: UTC+1 (CET)
  - Summer (DST): UTC+2 (CEST)
- Postal code: 3580
- Area code: 02982
- Website: www.rosenburg-mold.at

Rosenburg-Mold is a town in the district of Horn in Lower Austria, Austria. The Renaissance castle Rosenburg is located in the town.

== Population ==
Historical population
Year	Pop.	±%
1869	1,040	—
1880	1,095	+5.3%
1890	1,073	−2.0%
1900	1,049	−2.2%
1910	1,041	−0.8%
1923	1,173	+12.7%
1934	1,069	−8.9%
1939	1,118	+4.6%
1951	1,278	+14.3%
1961	1,168	−8.6%
1971	1,140	−2.4%
1981	1,061	−6.9%
1991	968	−8.8%
2001	1,010	+4.3%
2011	859	−15.0%
