= Drosendorf-Zissersdorf =

- Municipality
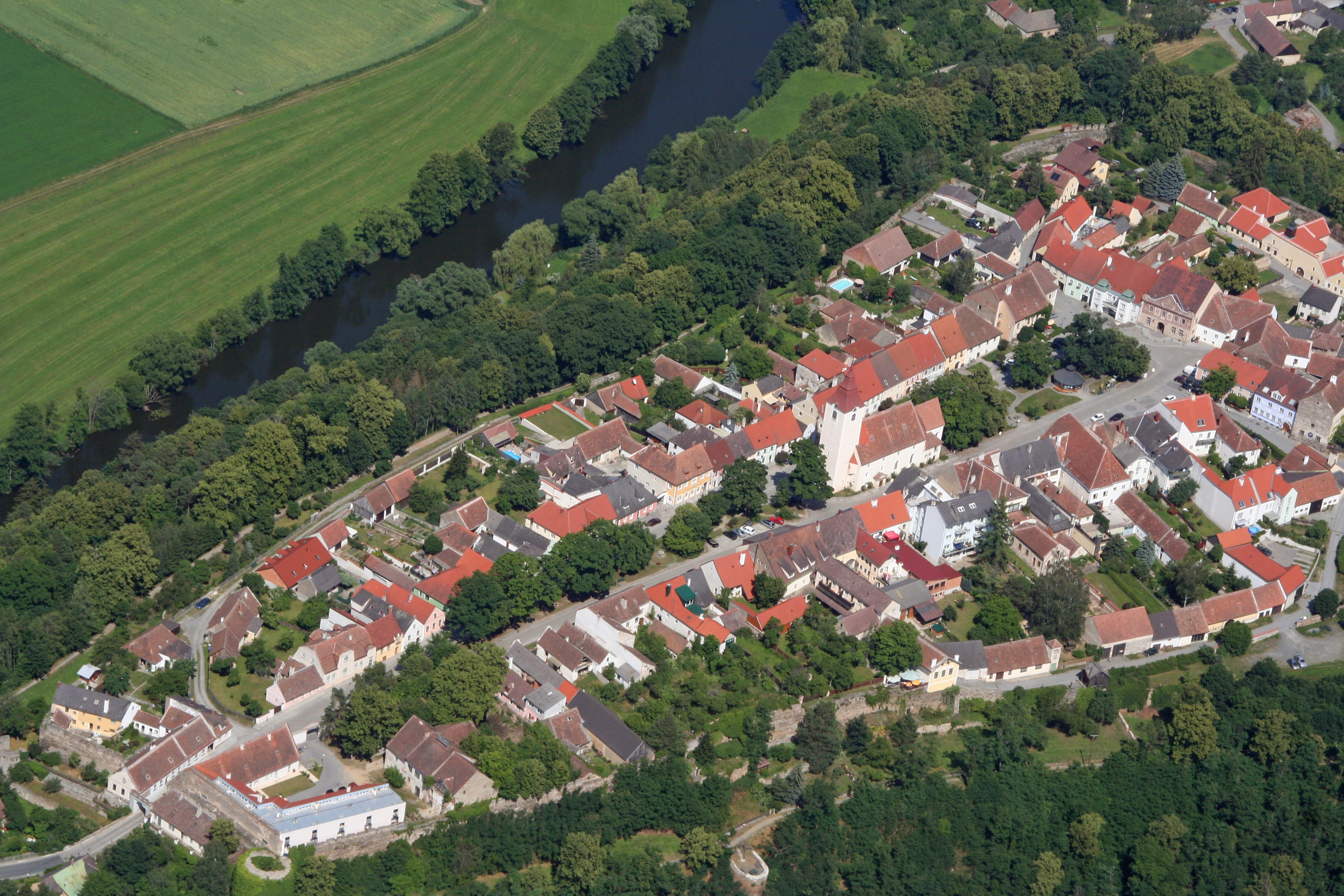
- Aerial view of Drosendorf-Zissersdorf

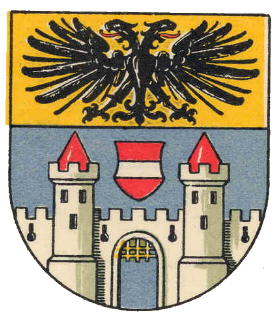
- Coat of arms

- Location within Austria
- Coordinates: 48°52′N 15°37′E
- Country: Austria
- State: Lower Austria
- District: Horn

Government
  - Mayor: Franz Kiestan

Area
  - Total: 53.47 km^{2} (20.64 sq mi)
- Elevation: 423 m (1,388 ft)

Population (2018-01-01)
  - Total: 1,213
  - Density: 22.69/km^{2} (58.76/sq mi)
- Time zone: UTC+1 (CET)
  - Summer (DST): UTC+2 (CEST)
- Postal code: 2095
- Area code: 02915
- Website: www.drosendorf.at

Drosendorf-Zissersdorf is a town in the district of Horn in Lower Austria, Austria.

== Population ==
Historical population
Year	Pop.	±%
1869	2,358	—
1880	2,392	+1.4%
1890	2,304	−3.7%
1900	2,295	−0.4%
1910	2,373	+3.4%
1923	2,470	+4.1%
1934	2,642	+7.0%
1939	2,459	−6.9%
1951	2,524	+2.6%
1961	2,189	−13.3%
1971	1,942	−11.3%
1981	1,690	−13.0%
1991	1,414	−16.3%
2001	1,309	−7.4%
2011	1,194	−8.8%
