= Straßburg, Austria =

Straßburg
- Municipality
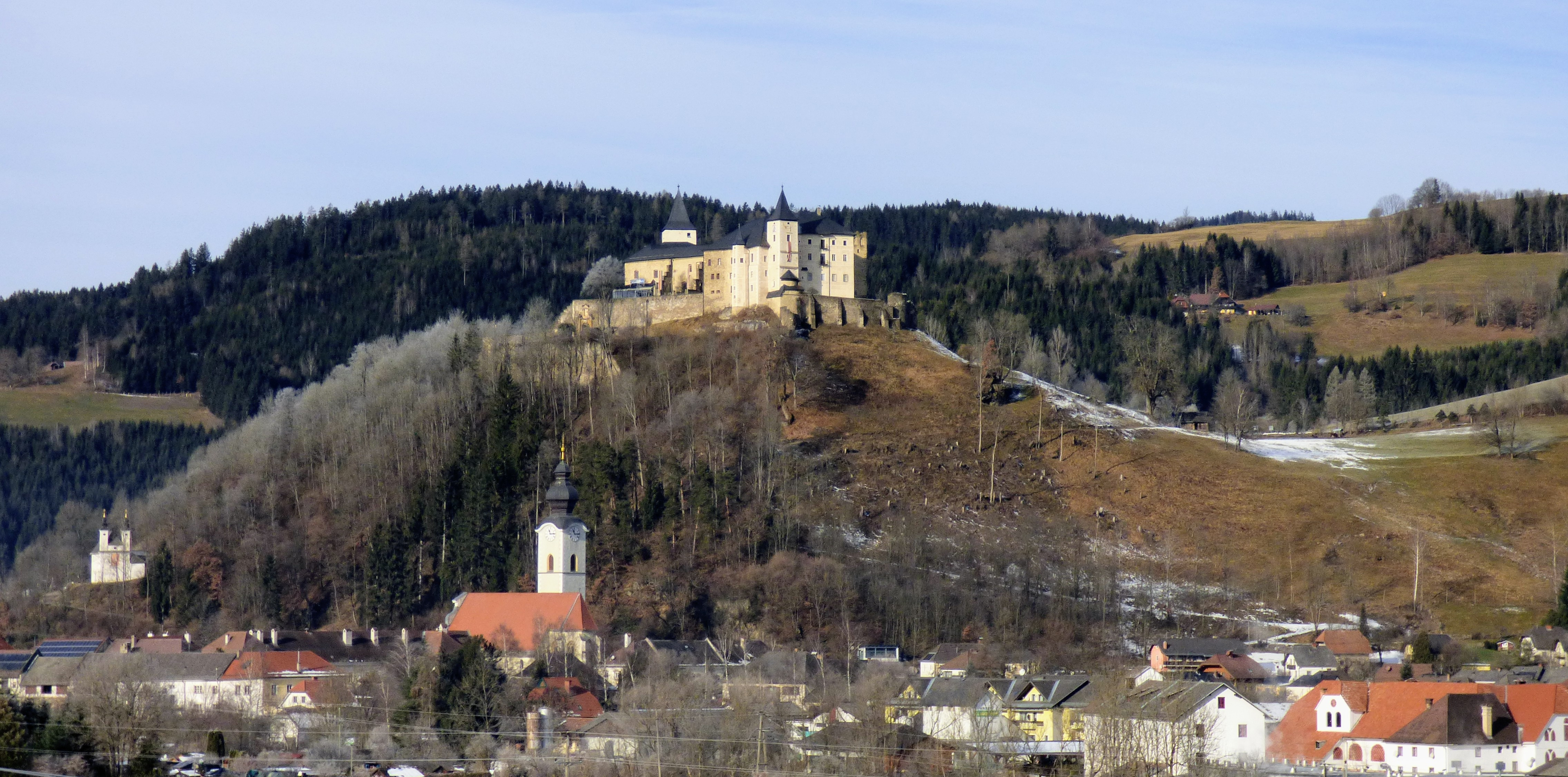
- Straßburg

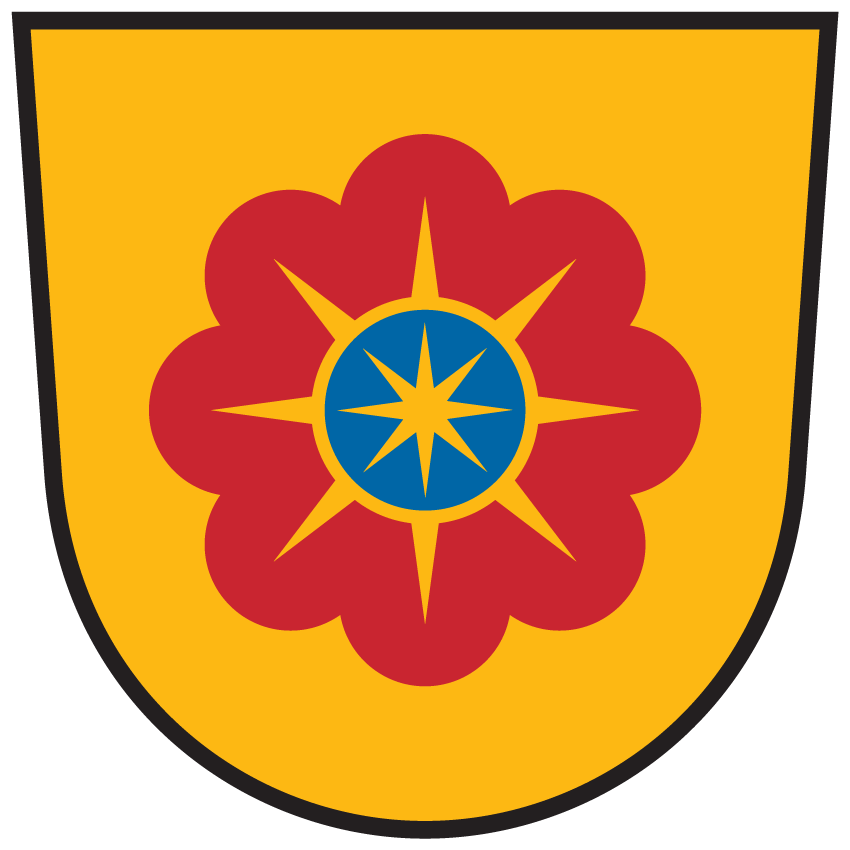
- Coat of arms

- Location within Austria
- Coordinates: 46°54′N 14°20′E
- Country: Austria
- State: Carinthia
- District: Sankt Veit an der Glan

Government
  - Mayor: Franz Pirolt (FPÖ)

Area
  - Total: 97.58 km^{2} (37.68 sq mi)
- Elevation: 642 m (2,106 ft)

Population (2018-01-01)
  - Total: 2,095
  - Density: 21.47/km^{2} (55.61/sq mi)
- Time zone: UTC+1 (CET)
  - Summer (DST): UTC+2 (CEST)
- Postal code: 9341
- Area code: 04266
- Website: www.strassburg.at

Straßburg (German pronunciation: [ˈʃtraːsbʊrk]) is a town in the district of Sankt Veit an der Glan in Carinthia, Austria.

== Geography ==
=== Location ===
The municipality lies in Northern Carinthia in the Gurk Valley among the Nock Mountains and the Gurk.

=== Municipal arrangement ===
Straßburg is divided into the following boroughs: St. Georgen, Straßburg-Land, and Straßburg-Stadt.

It is further divided into the districts of Bachl, Buldorf, Dörfl, Dielach, Dobersberg, Drahtzug, Edling, Gassarest, Glabötsch, Gruschitz, Gundersdorf, Höllein, Hackl, Hausdorf, Herd, Hohenfeld, Kraßnitz, Kreuth, Kreuzen, Kulmitzen, Langwiesen, Lees, Lieding, Machuli, Mannsdorf, Mellach, Mitterdorf, Moschitz, Olschnögg, Olschnitz, Olschnitz-Lind, Pöckstein-Zwischenwässern, Pölling, Pabenberg, Ratschach, Sankt Georgen, Sankt Jakob, Sankt Johann, Sankt Magdalen, Sankt Peter, Schattseite, Schmaritzen, Schneßnitz, Straßburg-Stadt.

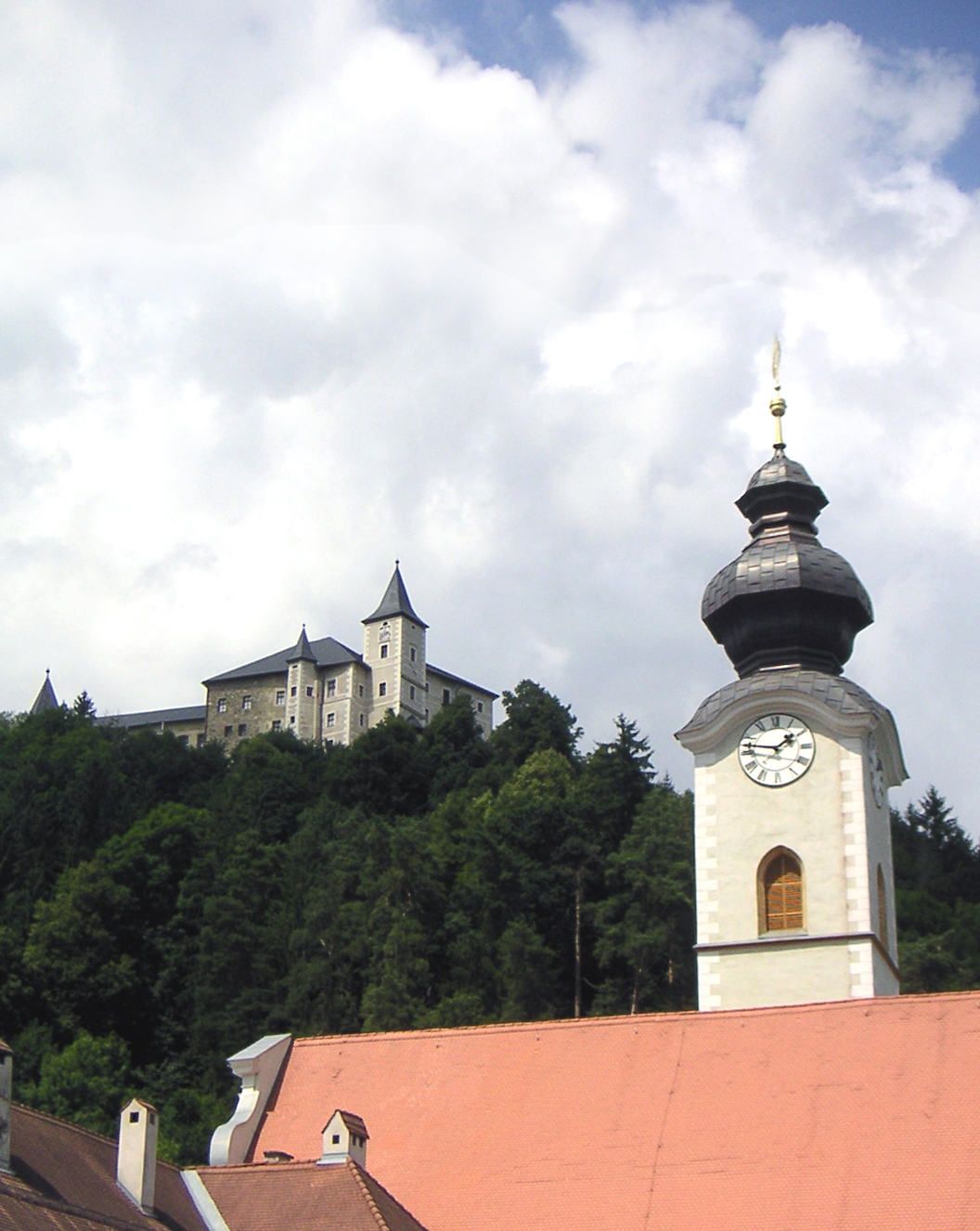
Straßburg Castle as seen from the town

== History ==
Straßburg was first mentioned in 864, when King Louis the German gave the Archdiocese of Salzburg a seat there. The Straßburg Fortress was erected in 1147 under the fourth Bishop of Gurk Roman I. In the 15th century, it was expanded into a castle and it served as the seat of Prince-Bishops of Gurk until the 18th century. As the bishop's seat, Straßburg was the most important town in the Gurk Valley and was thus elevated to a market town in 1229 and to a city in 1382. It received its city rights in 1402 from Prince-Bishop Conrad III von Helfenberg. The seat of the Gurk Bishops was moved in the 18th century to the nearby Pöckstein Castle in Zwischenwässern and then later to Klagenfurt, so the city lost its importance. The castle received extensive damage from the 1767 earthquake and was not rebuilt until the late 20th century.

== Population ==
According to the 2001 Census, Straßburg has 2,335 inhabitants. Of these, 90.8% said they were Catholic, 1.0% Protestant, and 2.2% Muslim. 3.3% of the population did not declare a belief.

== Politics ==
=== Municipal Council ===
The Straßburg Municipal Council has 19 seats and the following party mandates:

- 8 FPÖ
- 6 ÖVP
- 5 SPÖ

Mayor Ferdinand Wachernig's (FPÖ) greatest competition is Councilman Hubert PUTZ.

=== Twin cities ===
- Strasburg, Germany
- Treppo Grande, Italy

== Culture and landmarks ==
=== Museums ===
- The Folk Art Museum and the Hunting Museum in Straßburg Castle.

=== Buildings ===
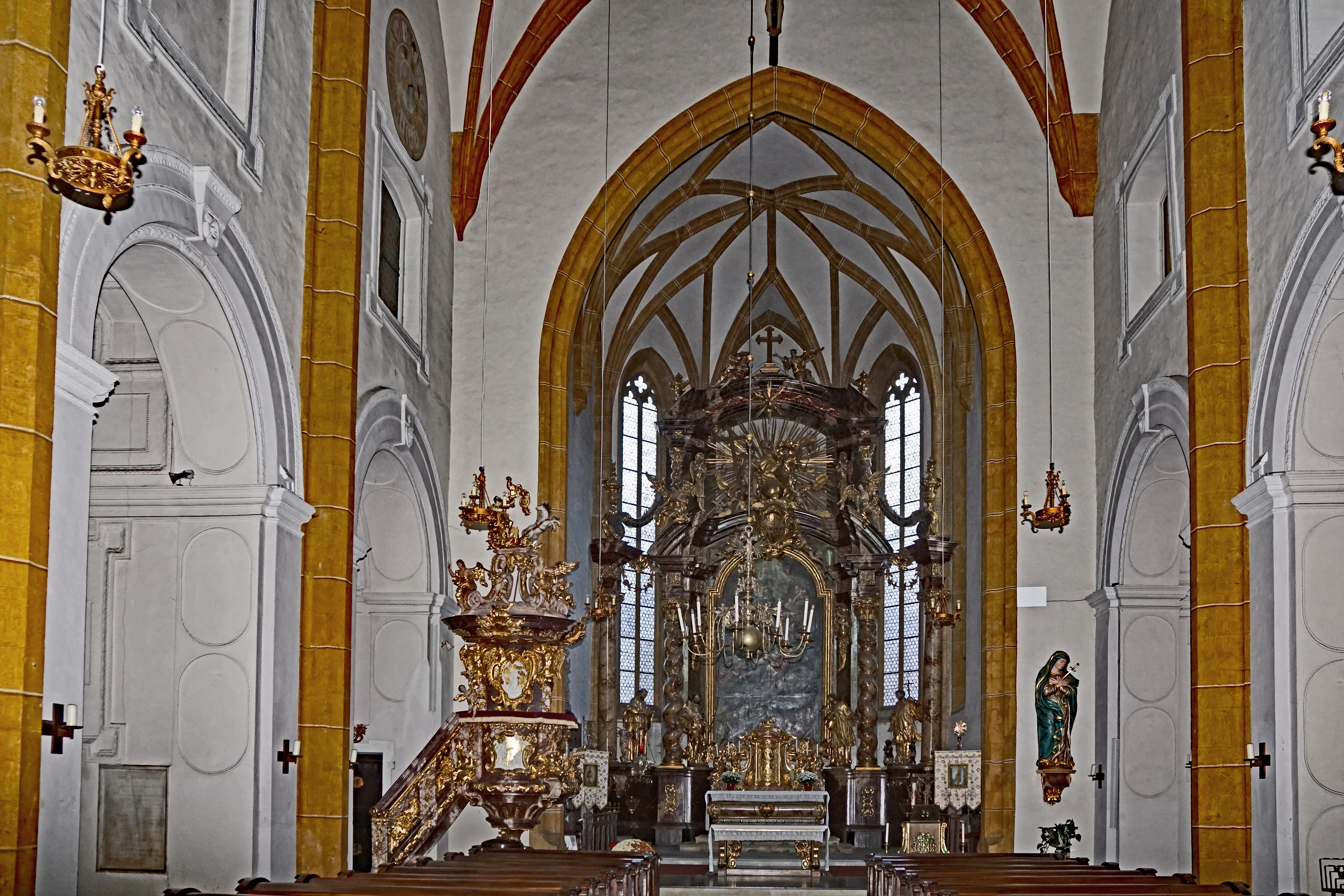
Interior of St. Nikolaus Church

- Straßburg Castle, the former residence of the Prince-Bishops of Gurk
- Pöckstein Castle
- St. Nikolaus Church, the parish church of Straßburg
- St. Margaretha zu Lieding Church: a romanesque church built around 1200 around with a quire and spire from the 14th century.
