= Gaspoltshofen =

- Municipality
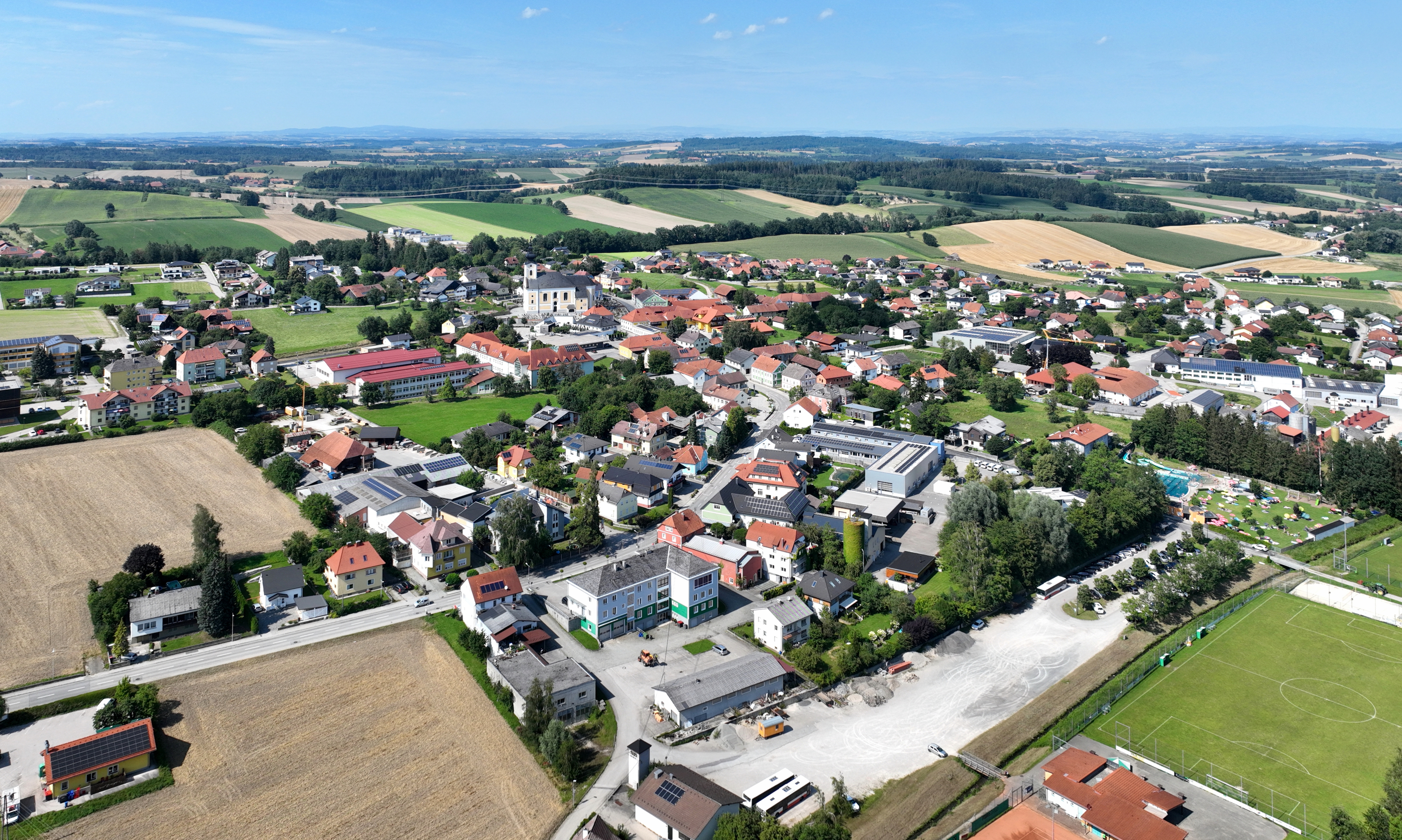

- Coat of arms

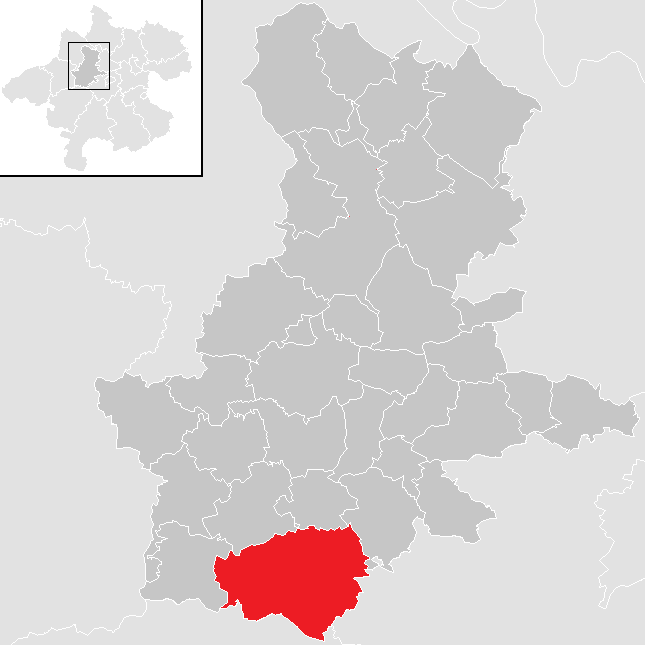
- Location in the district

- Location within Austria
- Coordinates: 48°08′40″N 13°44′11″E
- Country: Austria
- State: Upper Austria
- District: Grieskirchen

Government
  - Mayor: Wolfgang Klinger (FPÖ)

Area
  - Total: 40.61 km^{2} (15.68 sq mi)
- Elevation: 455 m (1,493 ft)

Population (2018-01-01)
  - Total: 3,566
  - Density: 87.81/km^{2} (227.4/sq mi)
- Time zone: UTC+1 (CET)
  - Summer (DST): UTC+2 (CEST)
- Postal code: 4673, 4674 (Altenhof)
- Area code: 07735
- Vehicle registration: GR
- Website: www.gaspoltshofen. ooe.gv.at

Gaspoltshofen is a municipality in the district of Grieskirchen in the Austrian state of Upper Austria.

== Geography ==
Gaspoltshofen lies in the Hausruckviertel. About 19 percent of the municipality is forest, and 71 percent is farmland.
