= Mariazell Railway =

Railway line in the Austrian alps

Mariazell Railway (Mariazellerbahn)
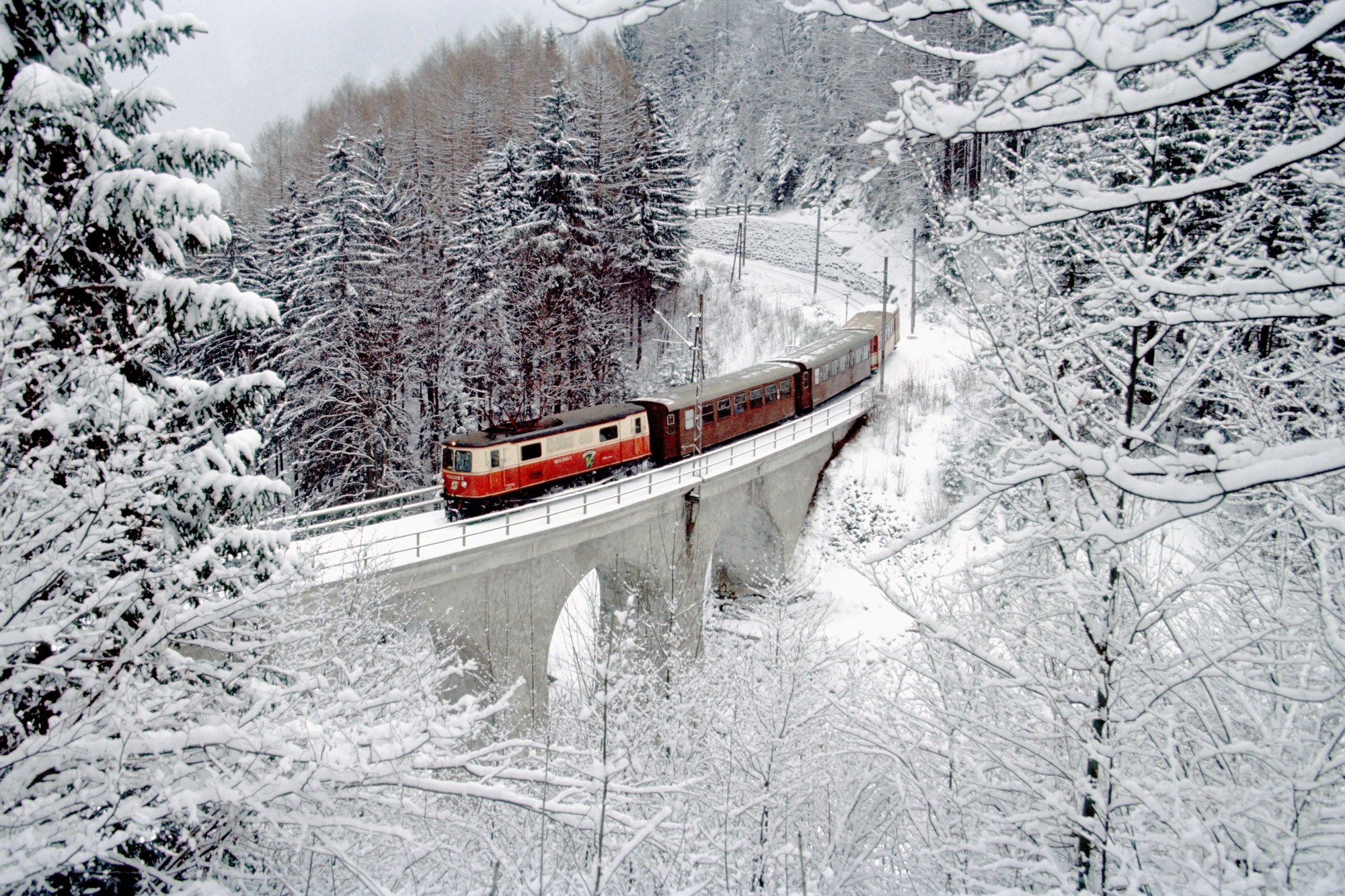
- Winter on the Heugrabenviadukt

Overview
- Locale: Austria (Lower Austria / Styria)
- Website: www.mariazellerbahn.at

Service
- Operator: NÖVOG

History
- Opened: 1898-1907
- 7 October 1911: Electrification
- December 2010: Takeover by NÖVOG

Technical
- Line length: 91.3 km (56.7 mi)
- Track gauge: 760 mm (2 ft 5 15/16 in)
- Electrification: 6.5 kV 25 Hz AC by overhead line

The Mariazell Railway (German: Mariazellerbahn) is an electrically operated 760 mm (2 ft 5 15/16 in) narrow-gauge railway which connects the Lower Austrian capital of Sankt Pölten with the Styrian pilgrimage centre of Mariazell. The line was opened in stages between 1898 and 1907, and had a, now closed, branch to Wieselburg an der Erlauf. The railway is operated by NÖVOG, which is owned by the provincial government, and is a part of the Verkehrsverbund Niederösterreich-Burgenland (Lower Austria and Burgenland Transport Association).

== History ==
=== Building and Steam Operation ===
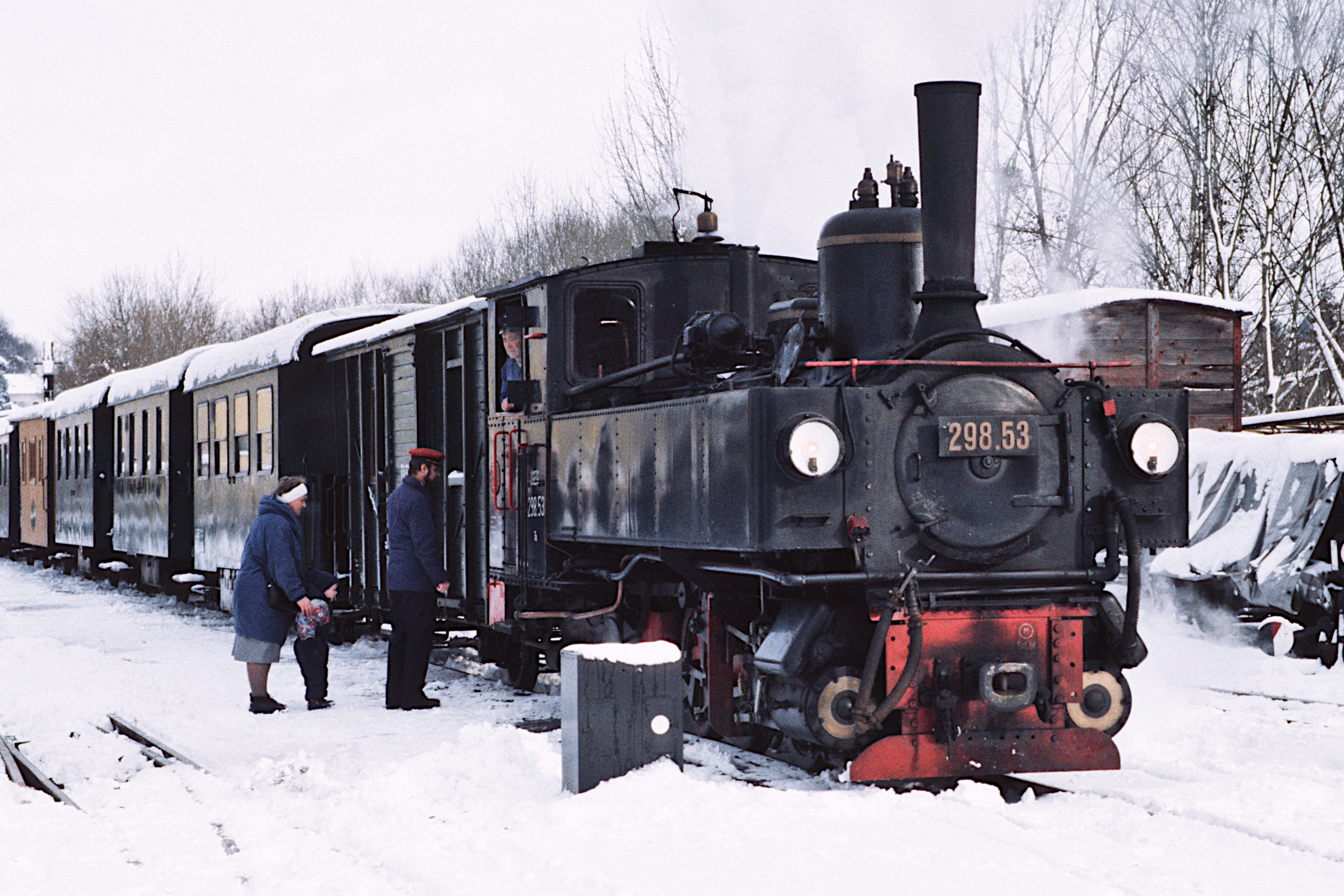
One of the Mariazell Railway's original U series locomotives today runs on the Steyrtalbahn

The pilgrimage center of Mariazell was one of Austria-Hungary's most visited places by foreigners in the 19th century. Much thought was already being given to building a railway from St. Pölten to Mariazell even at the time when the Westbahn, from Vienna to Linz via St. Pölten opened in 1858. Many variations on the idea of extending the standard-gauge line through the Lower Austrian foothills of the Alps were considered.

Only after the Lower Austrian State Railway Law was passed in 1895 did work begin on the project. Owing to the difficult terrain that the railway would have to cross, it was decided to build it to a narrow gauge. The gauge of 760 mm (2 ft 5 15/16 in), as with all narrow-gauge railway undertakings in the Danube Monarchy, was made necessary by the military administration. Rolling stock used in military service on railways in Bosnia and Hercegovina was 760 mm gauge and would need to be brought in. The railway's alignment would be built to a minimum curve radius of 80 m. In 1896, building work by the Lower Austrian State Railway Office began with acting director Engineer Josef Fogowitz in charge.

The mainline from St. Pölten to Kirchberg and the branch to Mank were opened on 4 July 1898; the operators were the state's own Lower Austrian State Railways. For the opening of these lines, the Lower Austrian State Railways bought four U Series steam locomotives, already proven on the Murtalbahn. The locomotives along with the two-axle passenger coaches and goods wagons, which were customary at the time, formed the railway network's basic equipment. The fleet was filled out in 1903 by two-axle light steam-powered railcars, which took over less-used trains.

As of 1902, building was continued and in 1905, the stretch through the Pielach valley as far as Laubenbachmühle and the branchline extension to Ruprechtshofen were completed. For the opening of this extension, and in anticipation of the further extension (the "mountain line") to Mariazell, a compound steam engine and a superheated steam engine were acquired as further developments of the U series.

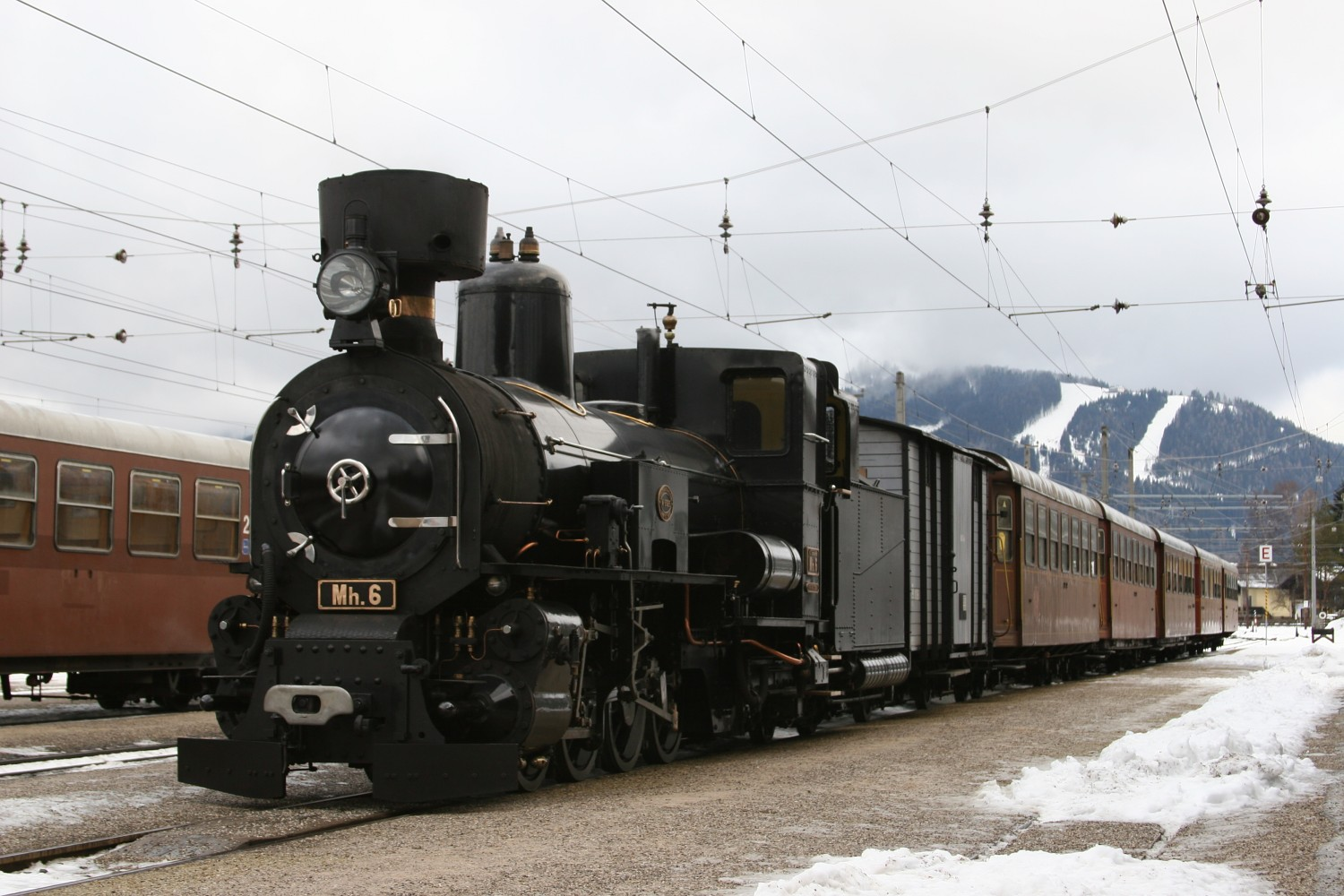
Mariazellerbahn Mh.6, now operating on the Mariazellerbahn as a museum locomotive with tourist train

In 1906, the Mariazell extension was sufficiently complete for freight traffic to be worked through to the terminus. On 2 May 1907, passenger service to Mariazell began running. That same summer, the final main line extension to Gußwerk was brought into service. For the mountainous extension to Mariazell, an especially high-performance engine was needed. The Krauss locomotive works in Linz proposed to build a locomotive with four powered axles and a tender, four of which were built by 1906 and used superheated steam. They were designated Mh (nowadays ÖBB 399). In 1907, two locomotives with compound steam workings were acquired and designated Mv. The "h" stood for "Heißdampf" (superheated steam), and the "v" for "Verbundantrieb" (compound working). Since the latter locomotives did not prove their worth, the next order was for two further locomotives of the Mh series. Since many passengers were expected, a great number of four-axled passenger coaches were bought, which were comparable in comfort and accoutrements with contemporary standard-gauge coaches. Also in 1906, three bigger and stronger steam railcars were delivered.

The "Lower Austrian-Styrian Alp Railway" (Niederösterreichisch-Steirische Alpenbahn) as the railway was known in Austro-Hungarian officialese, was thereby complete. Far-reaching plans for an extension over the Styrian Seeberg and a connection with the likewise narrow-gauge Thörlerbahn, and thereby with the Styrian railway network, had no work done on them owing to the outbreak of the First World War. Also, a connection to the Ybbstalbahn was never built.

Once open, the rush of passengers was so great that for a time, the railway did not even bother with advertising. Among the various kinds of freight carried on the railway were agricultural products, ores from local mines, and wood from the heavily forested mountain region. Wood remained the most important kind of goods on the Mariazell Railway right up until freight operations were discontinued. As early as 1909, standard-gauge goods wagons were being transported along the Mariazellerbahn on transporter wagons, insofar as the railway's narrow loading gauge would allow it.

=== Electrification ===
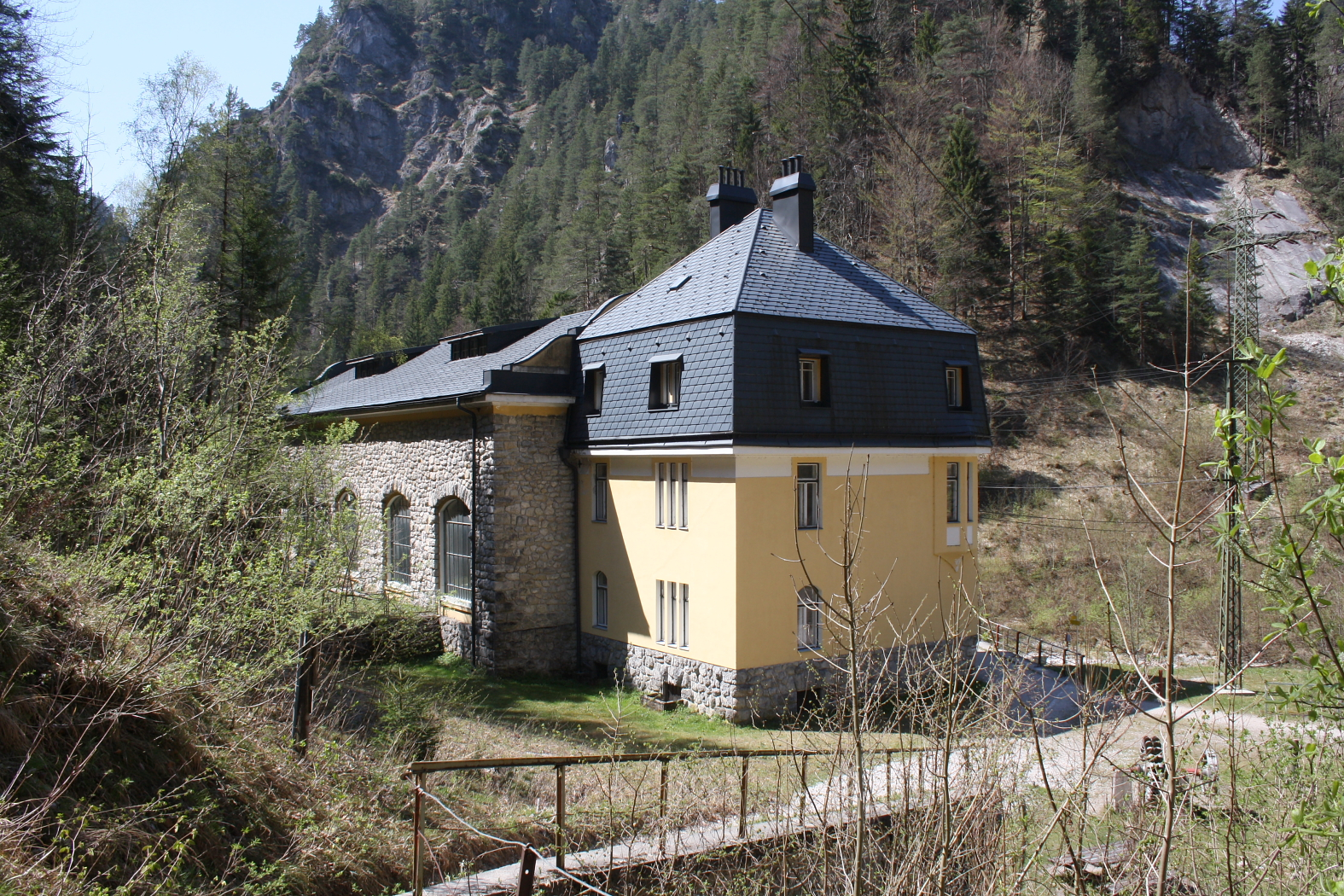
Wienerbruck power station built between 1908 and 1911

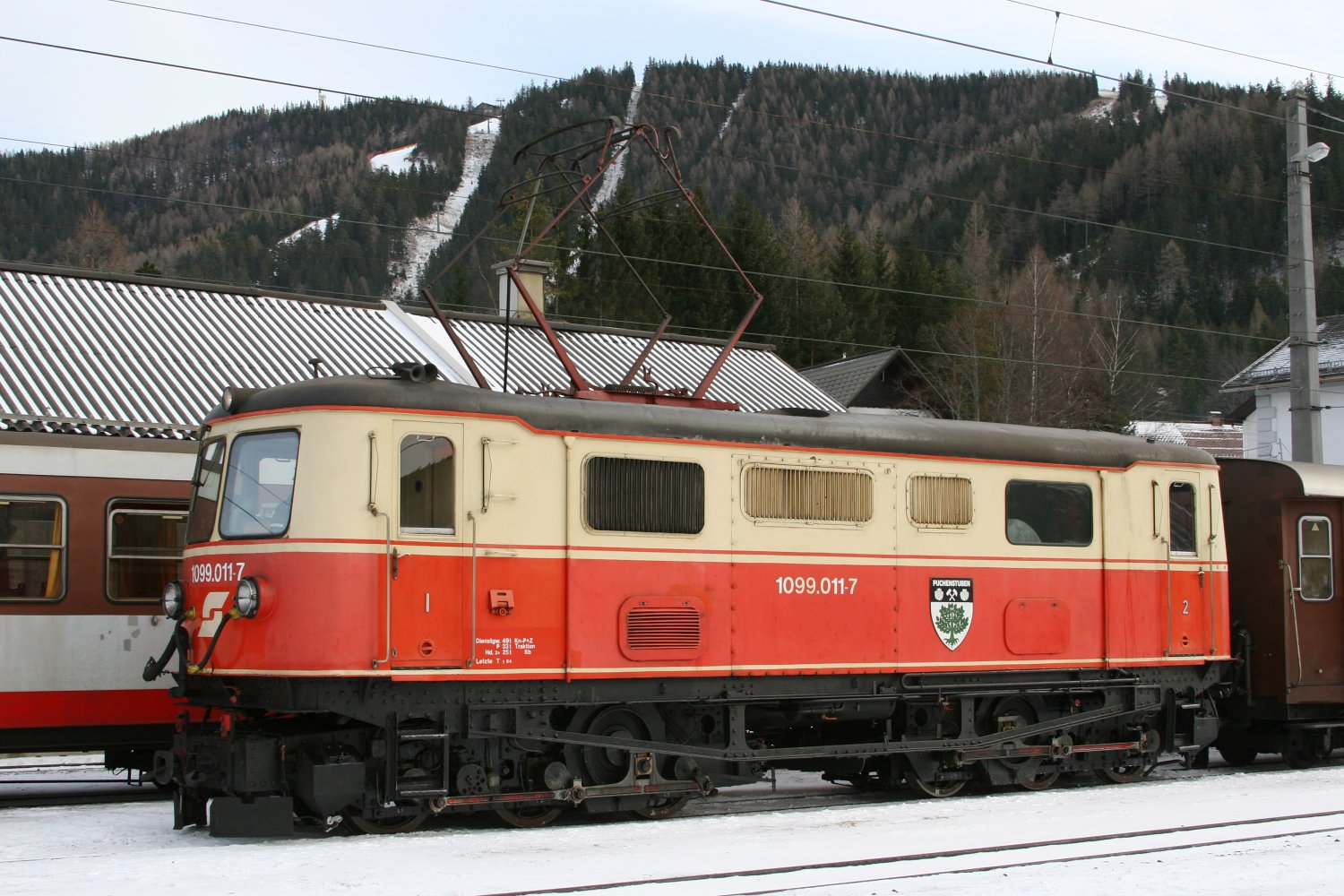
An original 1099-series locomotive, albeit in rebuilt form, at Mariazell station

It quickly became apparent that the series Mh and Mv locomotives were not adequate for the traffic on offer. Several scenarios for raising the railway's performance were considered, among them double-tracking and the acquisition of an even stronger type of steam locomotive. At this time, the acting director of the State Railway Office, Engineer Eduard Engelmann jr., brought forth the suggestion that the Mariazell Railway be electrified using single-phase alternating current.

This suggestion was said to be revolutionary. There had never been a railway line of such length meant to handle mainline traffic that had been electrically operated. The only electric traction at this time was to be found on tramways and light, local railways, which used only direct current (DC) throughout. Only the tram-like Stubaitalbahn in Tyrol, built in 1904, was using alternating current (AC). Despite great opposition, Engelmann managed to implement his vision. So, the Mariazell Railway was electrified between 1907 and 1911, making use of the mountainous region's vast hydroelectric resources.

Once electrification began in 1911, 16 E series locomotives (still used today as ÖBB 1099) were delivered between 1909 and 1914. Thereafter, steam trains disappeared from the main line after only five years. All the steam railcars were sold, and most of the steam locomotives remained on the still unelectrified branch line. A few were sent to the Waldviertler Schmalspurbahnen.

By implementing their intentions, many unprecedented concepts were realized. The experience garnered from the electrification proved to be the benchmark for later projects of the same kind. Unlike tramway electrification, the wires were hung using massive wire gantries and steel masts. Also, the locomotive design with two separate powered bogies is widespread today. The power stations, necessary for the electrical supply, were built under very difficult conditions in the mountainous landscape. They were also used to supply the region with electricity, thereby laying the groundwork for the Lower Austrian state energy company NEWAG, now known as EVN.

=== From the First World War until 1945 ===
During the First World War, quite a number of steam locomotives and a great number of wagons were temporarily confiscated for wartime duty, among them the locomotives Mh.1 to Mh.5. The last one was returned from Sarajevo in 1920.

The branch line from Ober-Grafendorf to Ruprechtshofen, after building had been interrupted by the war, was extended to Gresten in 1927 but not electrified. All other expansion projects, even though some were still being discussed even after 1945, were never realized. With the extension of the branchline to Gresten came new P and Uh series steam locomotives (ÖBB 199 and 498, respectively).

In 1922, the Bundesbahn Österreich (BBÖ) took over the Mariazell Railway from the Lower Austrian State Railways, which had fallen into financial difficulties.

The first diesel locomotive was tested on the line in the 1930s. This type, later described as ÖBB 2190, was only suited for light passenger trains. The self-powered luggage railcars (series 2041 or ÖBB 2091) were slightly better in performance.

After Anschluss in 1938, the narrow-gauge railway, like all Austrian railways, became part of the Deutsche Reichsbahn. During the wartime years 1944 and 1945, there was wartime destruction and damage in many places, especially around St. Pölten.

=== After 1945 ===
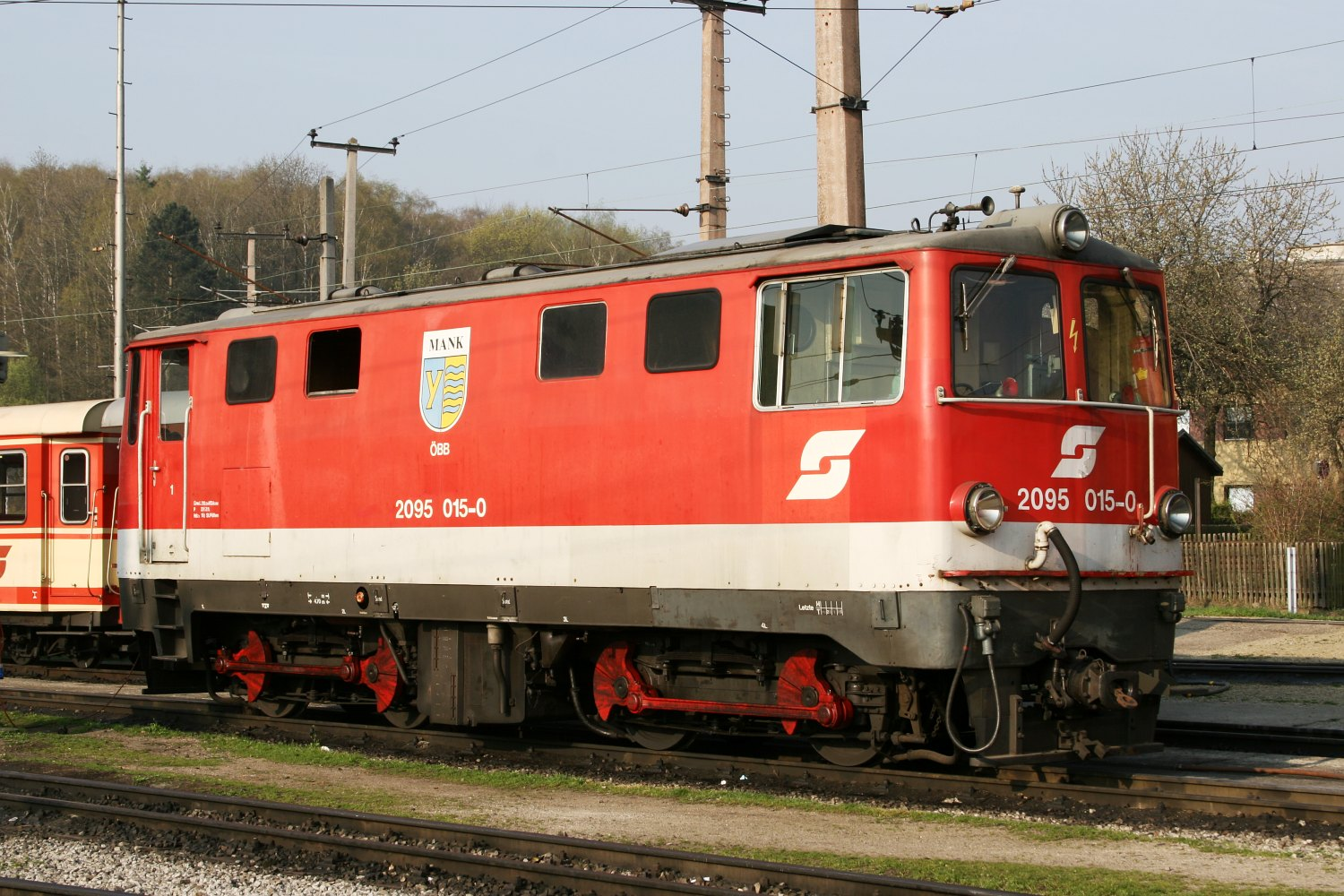
An ÖBB series 2095 diesel locomotive at the St. Pölten Alpenbahnhof

After the Second World War, the former State Railway lines became part of the Österreichische Bundesbahnen (ÖBB). The rolling stock was given a new number scheme in 1953. In the following years, there were some alignment corrections on the line. That, and the rebuilding of the rolling stock in the 1950s and 1960s, as well as the changeover to diesel working on the branch line were the furthest-reaching modernization measures undertaken on the railway. Between 1959 and 1962, the original electric locomotives, now known as ÖBB class 1099, were given new, more modern style, bodies, whilst retaining the same traction equipment. The passenger coaches were likewise provided with matching steel bodies. In 1962, the steam engines were replaced by new diesel locomotives, of ÖBB class 2095. The series 399 locomotives went to the Waldviertler Schmalspurbahnen, whilst the remaining steam locomotives were withdrawn from service.

In 1981, a speeding train derailed on Buchberggraben viaduct, killing the driver. The locomotive involved (ÖBB 1099.015) was scrapped at the site and was the only one to have such an big incident.

In 1984, the last Rollböcke, the more primitive type of transporter wagon using forks to hold the standard-gauge wagon's axles, were replaced with Rollwagen, the more advanced type resembling a wagon with a short stretch of standard-gauge track onto which the standard-gauge wagon is fastened.

In 1994, two newly developed electric multiple unit (EMU) trains (ÖBB class 4090) were acquired. One had 2 Railcars with 2 sidecars, the other one had a Railcar, sidecar & Control Car. In 1995, these were supplemented by some diesel railcars (ÖBB class 5090) for use on lighter loaded services and on the branch line.

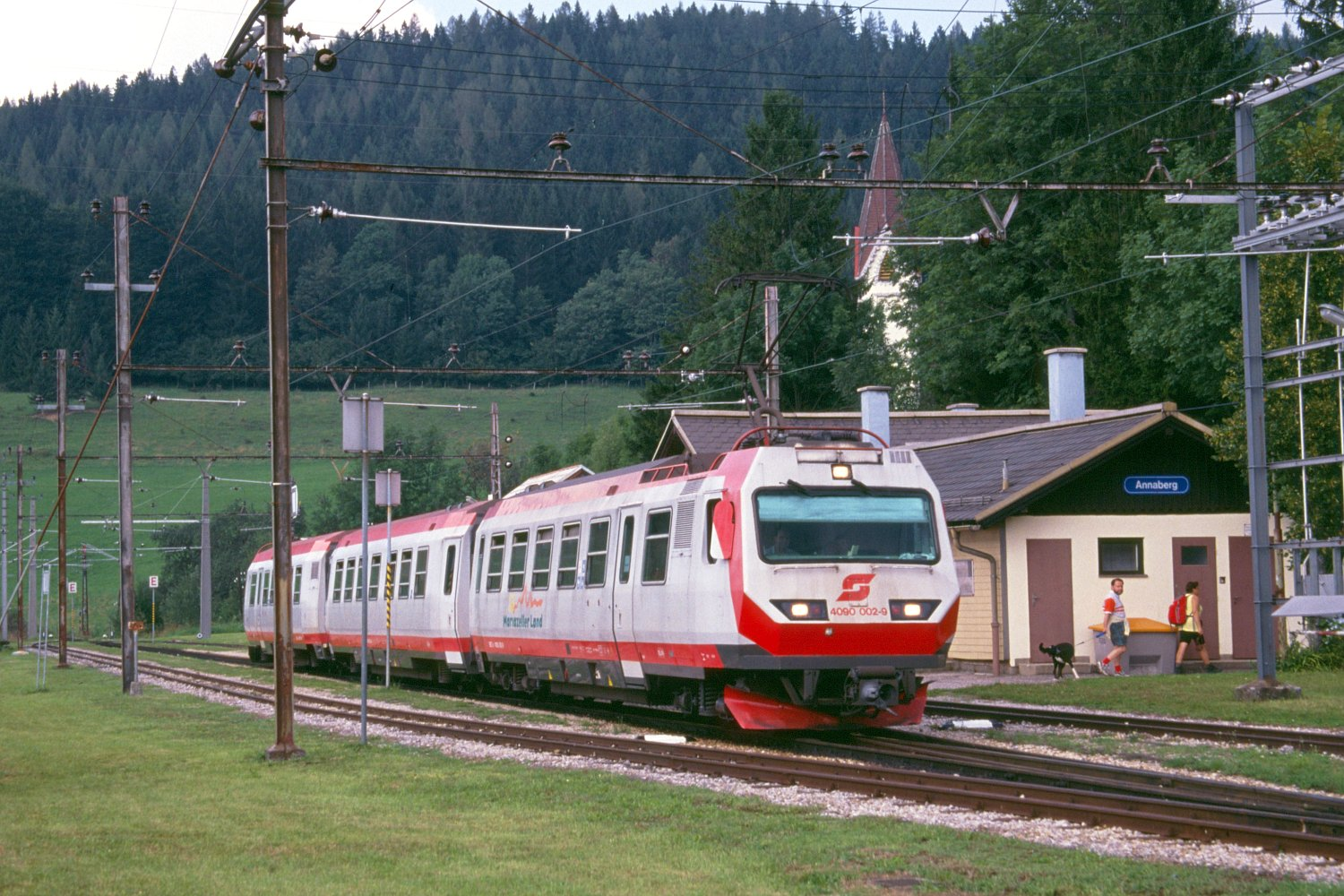
A ÖBB series 4090 multiple-unit train at Annaberg station

In the wave of secondary-railway abandonments in Lower Austria, even the Mariazell Railway was affected. Freight traffic using narrow-gauge wagons on the Mountain Line was completely given up, and the short stretch of line between Mariazell and Gußwerk was abandoned in 1988. Freight service still continued for a few years as far as Schwarzenbach an der Pielach after it had been discontinued to Mariazell, but it was limited to wood carried in narrow-gauge wagons. On 31 December 1998, ÖBB ended transporter wagon service on the Valley Line and the remaining section of the branchline, thereby ending all freight service on the Mariazell Railway.

Passenger traffic on the branch slowly diminished. The line from Wieselburg to Gresten was converted from narrow-gauge to standard gauge in 1998 due to extensive freight operations, discontinuing passenger operations. Before then, the standard-gauge goods wagons were loaded onto transporter wagons in Wieselburg for the trip along this stretch of line. In connection with this gauge conversion, passenger service on the line east of Wieselburg to Ruprechtshofen was discontinued in 2001, followed by the discontinuation of service between Mank and Ruprechtshofen in 2003. Service on the last section of the branch line, between Ober Grafendorf and Mank, ceased in 2010, when the line closed completely.

As of about 2000, the ÖBB was considering selling or abandoning the main line between St. Pölten and Mariazell. In the autumn of 2003, a plan was drawn up to convert the line between St. Pölten and Kirchberg an der Pielach to standard gauge, as this stretch was considered important for commuters and school children. However neither plan was carried out, and the ÖBB continued to provide narrow gauge service on the main line up to the transfer of the line in 2010.

=== Back to provincial ownership ===
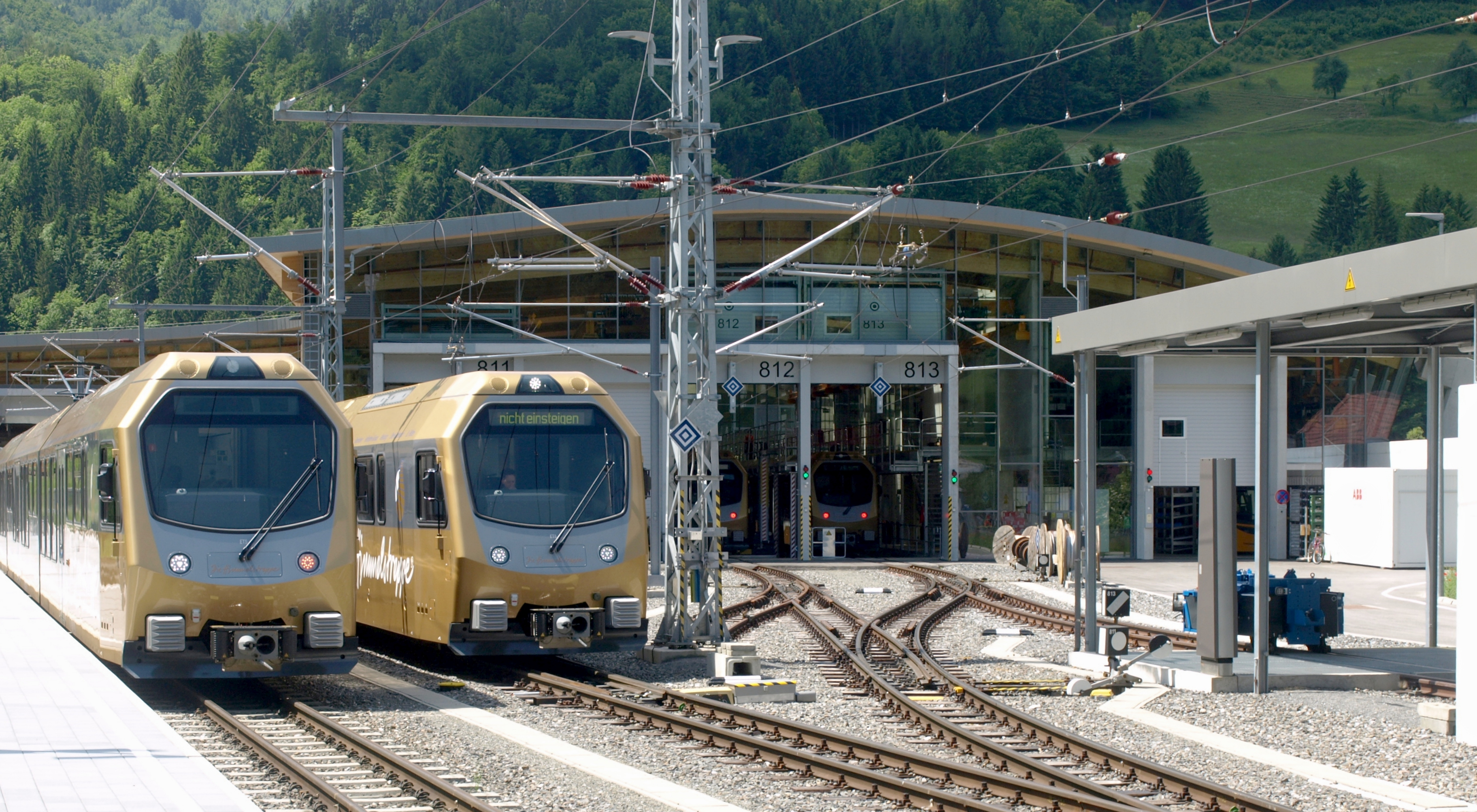
New trains in front of the new depot

In 2010, the ÖBB transferred responsibility for the railway to the provincial government of Lower Austria. Operation became the responsibility of NÖVOG, which is owned by the provincial government. As part of this transfer, NÖVOG announced plans to modernise the line at a total cost of €117m, including €65m on new rolling stock, €20m on a new depot, €20m on infrastructure, €7.5m on the overhead electrical supply and €4.5m on signalling.

In December 2010, an order was placed for nine low-floor Himmelstreppe EMUs to be built by Stadler Rail. In order accommodate the new trains and provide a new operating centre for NÖVOG, a new station with depot and workshop was built at Laubenbachmühle between 2011 and 2013. In December 2012 the first of the new units was shown to the public at Laubenbachmühle depot. The final unit was delivered in January 2014, allowing the full normal service of the line to be operated with such trains.

== Lines ==
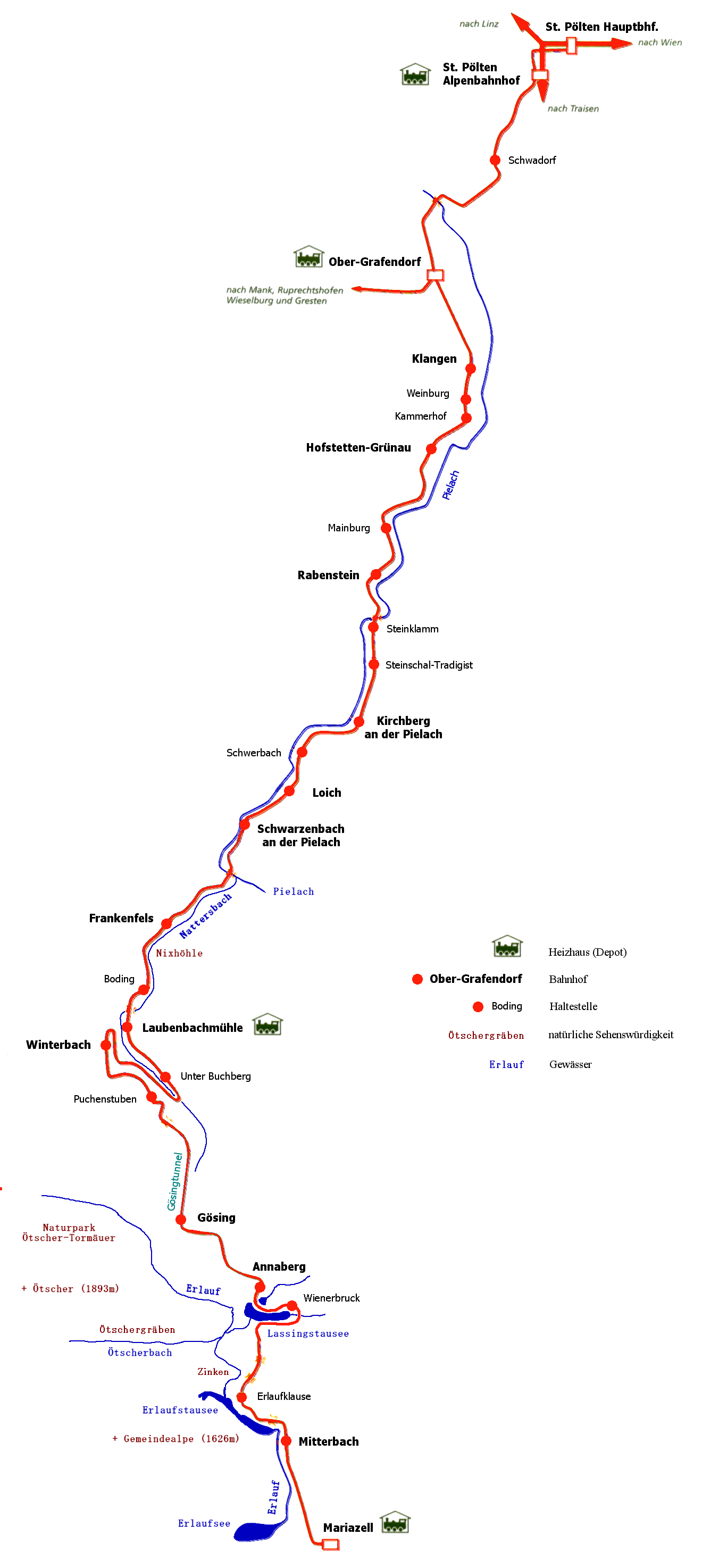
Mariazell Railway lines

=== Valley Line (Talstrecke) ===
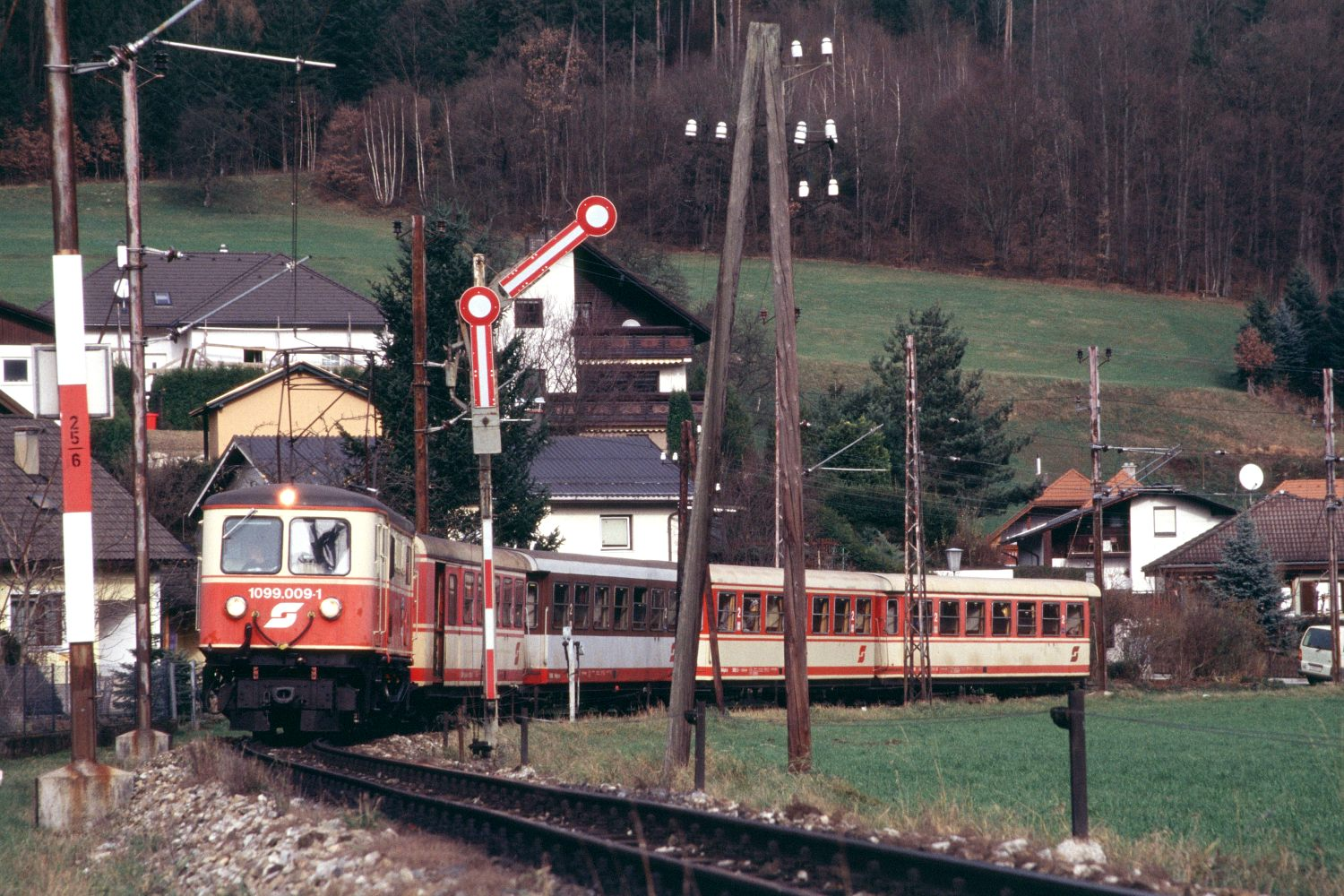
At the semaphore signal near Rabenstein an der Pielach

The Mariazellerbahn begins at the St. Pölten Hauptbahnhof railway station. Right after leaving the station, the line passes through a tunnel under the Leobersdorfer Bahn, another railway serving St. Pölten. The Alpenbahnhof that comes right after that was, until the construction of the new Laubenbachmühle operating centre, the railway's main operational center. The rolling stock sheds, workshops, and extensive freight facilities are now largely used for storing surplus rolling stock. Next, the railway quickly leaves the town and passes through hilly, farmed land for the first few kilometers, south of St. Pölten from the Traisen valley into the Pielach valley. The route quickly reaches the biggest station on the line at Ober-Grafendorf, which includes the junction with the abandoned branch line.

The mainline follows the Pielach valley through Hofstetten-Grünau, Rabenstein an der Pielach, the main center in the valley, Kirchberg an der Pielach, and on to the station at Loich, which was once of special importance to freight operations. The tunnel further along was built with only the railway's own loading gauge in mind, making freight transport by transporter wagons impossible. From here, the valley narrows considerably, and shortly before the next station, Schwarzenbach an der Pielach, the line passes through the Weißenburgtunnel, thereby leaving the Pielach valley and coming out into the Nattersbach valley, which narrows rather like a gorge. The line reaches first Frankenfels, and then the station at Laubenbachmühle.

The large new station and depot at Laubenbachmühle, designed to blend into the surrounding landscape, is now the line's main operating centre. It also marks a change in the nature of the line, which after this point is known as the "Mountain Line" (Bergstrecke).

=== Mountain Line (Bergstrecke) ===
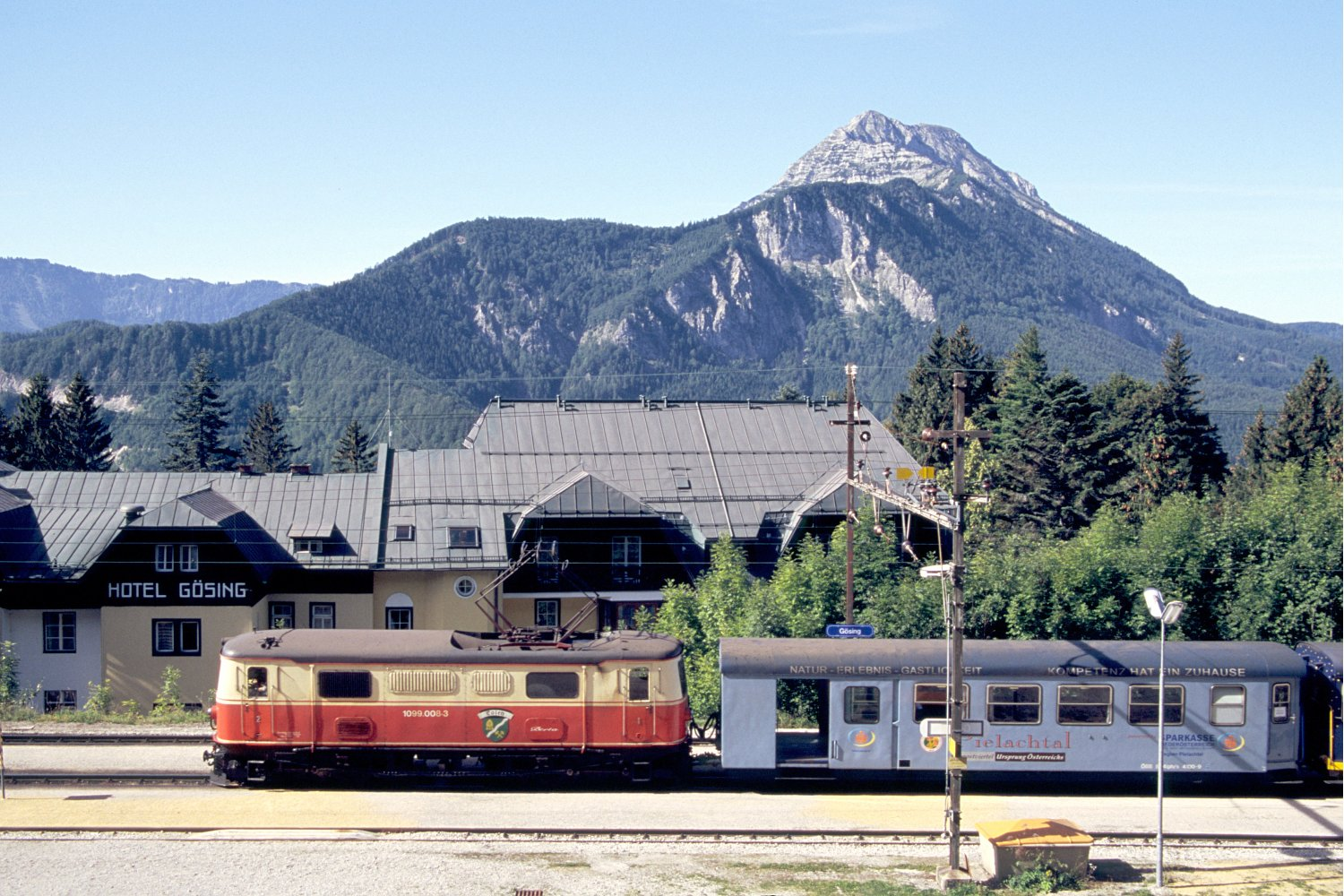
Gösing station with the Ötscher behind

From Laubenbachmühle, an elongated double horseshoe curve climbs out of the Nattersbach valley. After passing by stations at Winterbach and Puchenstuben, the line reaches the longest tunnel, the 2-km-long Gösingtunnel, which with an altitude of 891.6 m above sea level is the line's highest point. The line exits the tunnel into the Erlauf valley, which it then follows until just before the end. After the tunnel comes Gösing station, about 350 m above the settlement of Erlaufboden. The 1893 meter-high Ötscher is visible from here. This panorama and the ease of reaching the spot on the newly built railway led to the building of a hotel just across from the station when the railway was first opened.

From there, the railway follows a wooded, steep mountain ridge on a slight downhill gradient. It passes over the Saugrabenviadukt, the railway's highest viaduct, and reaches Annaberg station on the saddle. Just beyond the Lassing Reservoir, which feeds the Wienerbruck power station, lies Wienerbruck-Josefsberg station, a favorite starting point for hikes into the Ötschergräben, steep-sided, wooded gorges. After a loop around the lake, the line meets the Erlauf River. This stretch of the line is said to be the railway's greatest highlight for those with great romanticism for the wild: In between, along a row of short tunnels, the traveller gets a look into the Zinken ("tines"), as the craggy Erlauf gorge is called here. The halt at Erlaufklause is the last stop in the province of Lower Austria.

The next stop, at Mitterbach am Erlaufsee, is in the province of Styria. This is followed by Mariazell station, the terminus of the line. Whilst this station serves the pilgrimage center of Mariazell, it is actually located some 1 kilometre (0.62 mi) north in the municipality of Sankt Sebastian. Connection is made here with the Museumstramway Mariazell-Erlaufsee, a standard gauge heritage steam tramway that operates to the nearby Erlaufsee. The Mariazell line formerly continued 7 kilometres (4.3 mi) to Gußwerk, which was used mostly for freight traffic to a large sawmill. It has been out of service since 1988, and the tracks were torn up in 2003. Museumstramway Mariazell-Erlaufsee is planning to take over a short part of the right-of-way for a project to build a tram line from the railway station into town.

=== The Branchline (Krumpe) ===
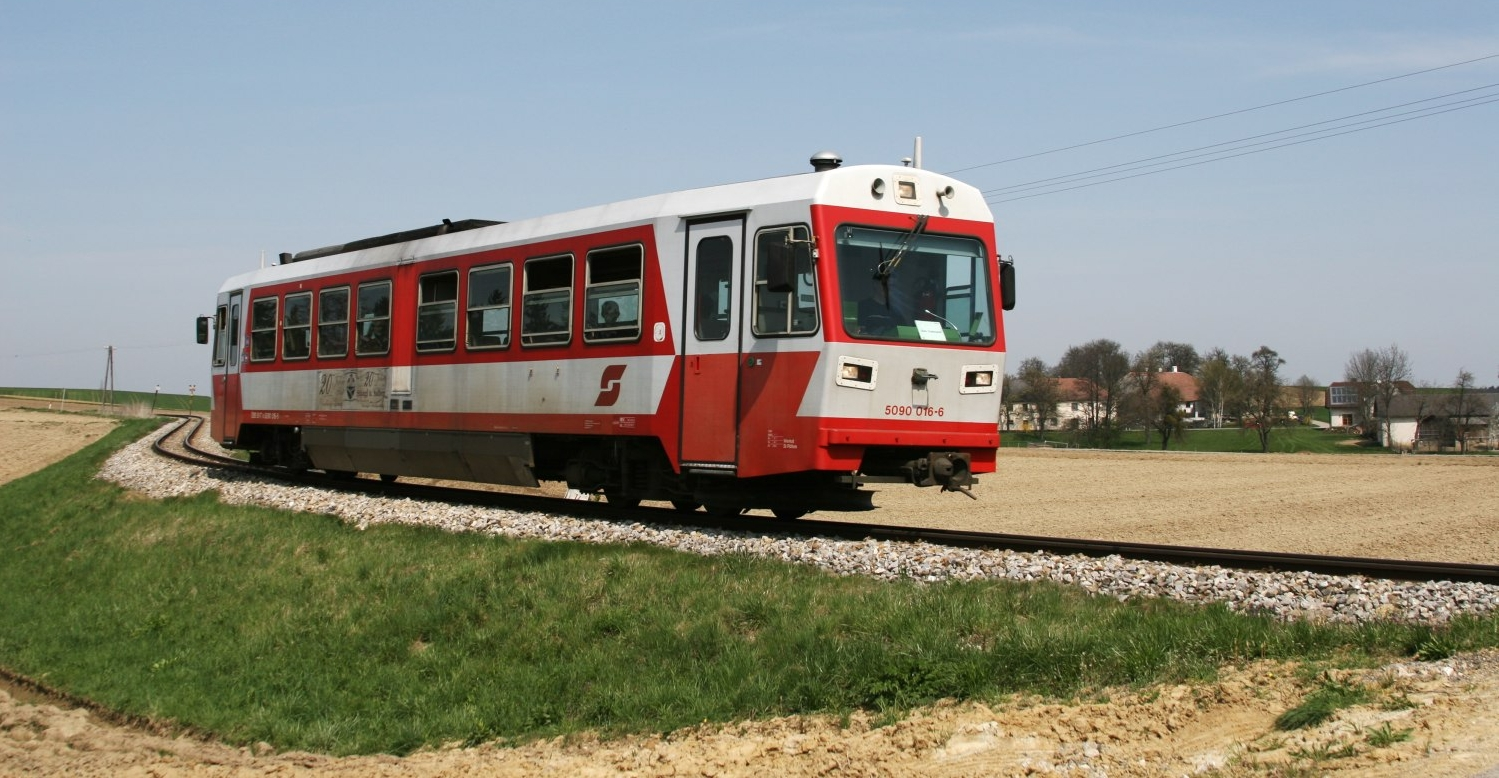
5090-series Railcar near Kilb

The now largely closed branch line was known to locals as the Krumpe (Lower Austrian dialect form of the word krumm, meaning "crooked" in German), as a reflection of its indirect nature. It left the main line at Ober-Grafendorf and was an unelectrified branch that lead through the foothills of the Alps in a roughly westerly direction by way of Kilb, Mank, Sankt Leonhard am Forst, Ruprechtshofen and Wieselburg an der Erlauf to Gresten. At Wieselburg an der Erlauf, it met and crossed the standard-gauge Erlauf Valley Railway between Pöchlarn and Kienberg-Gaming.

The stretch of the line between Wieselburg an der Erlauf and Gresten still exists as a standard gauge line, having been regauged in 1998 in order to better feed freight traffic onto the Erlauf Valley line. The line from Ober-Grafendorf to Wieselburg an der Erlauf still exists but is not in use. The section from Ober-Grafendorf to Mank was the last part of the line to see narrow gauge trains, but has not been used since 2010. There are plans to convert this latter section into a heritage railway.

== Operation ==
On weekdays, Himmelstreppe trains operate every hour between St. Pölten and Laubenbachmühle. Depending on the time of year, between 6 and 10 of these trains continue to and from Mariazell. On weekends and public holidays, a slightly reduced service is operated, but this is supplemented in summer by some regular trains hauling panoramic coaches, and by additional trains hauled by electric or steam locomotives.

== Accidents and incidents ==
- On 26 June 2018, a Himmelstreppe unit was derailed at St. Pölten. Thirty people were injured, three seriously.

== Rolling Stock ==
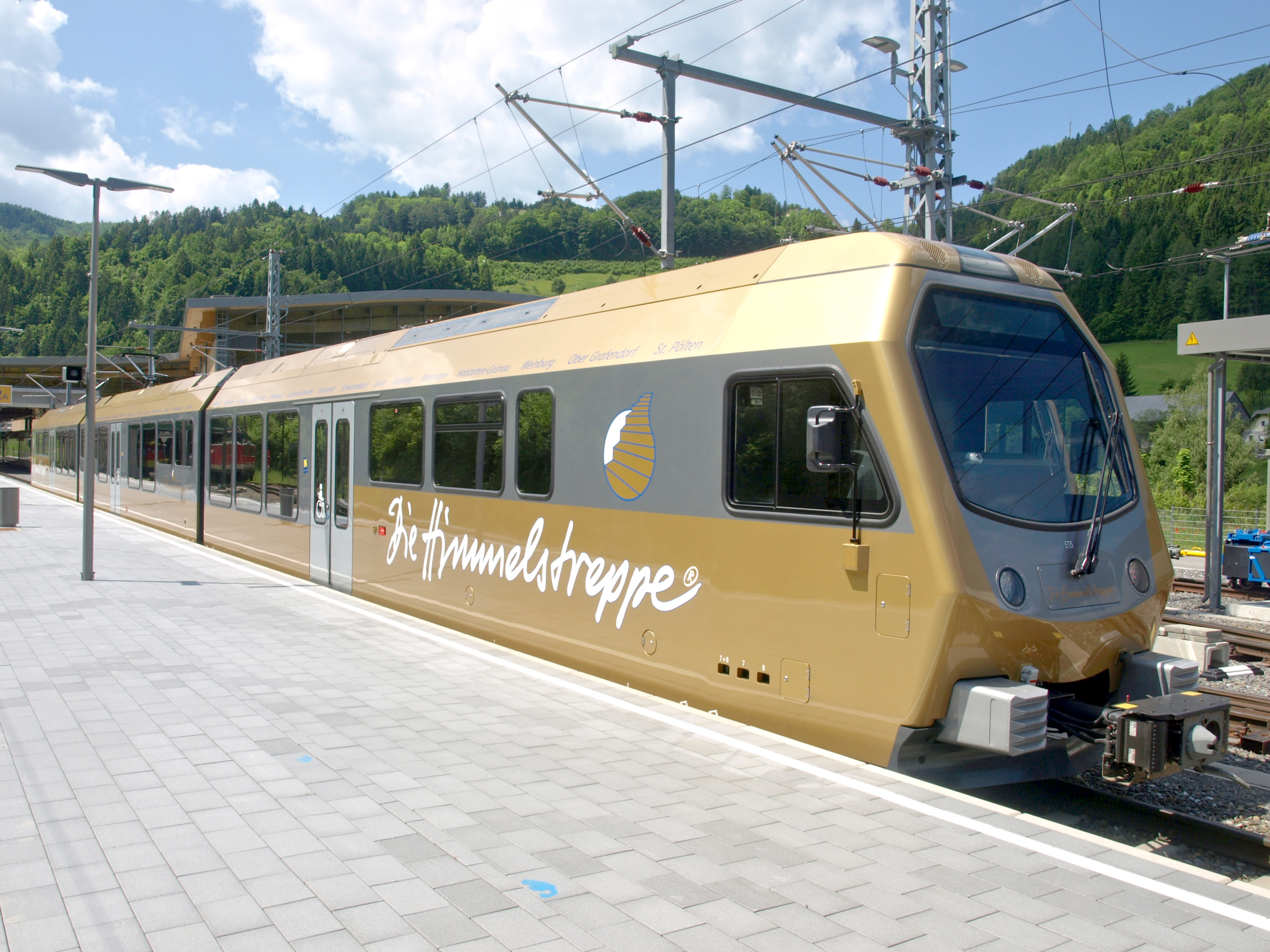
New Himmelstreppe train

The normal passenger service on the line is now provided by a fleet of nine low-floor EMUs built by Stadler Rail, which entered service between 2012 and 2014. In summer these pull matching panoramic first-class coaches from a fleet of four. The three-car articulated EMUs are designed to operate up to 80 km/h, and are prominently branded Himmelstreppe ("Stairway to Heaven"), a name chosen to reflect the line's terminus in the pilgrimage centre of Mariazell.

A number of the line's older electric locomotives (the 100-year-old class 1099), diesel locomotives (class 2095), diesel railcars (class 5090) and passenger coaches have been retained for special services. Additionally, one class 1099 has been donated to the Vienna Technical Museum and another may be rebuilt to return it to its original, pre-1959, state. The two class 4090 EMUs, built in 1994, are stored out of doors at St. Pölten Alpenbahnhof. All three Railcars of the EMU have been scrapped while one of the three sidecars has been rebuilt for the Pinzgau Local Railway. The remaining two sidecars and the only control car have been stored with an uncertain future.

For nostalgic runs, the Mh.6 steam engine stationed in Ober-Grafendorf is brought in. This was a private initiative in the 1990s by several Mariazell Railway employees who managed to fetch back the Mountain Line's original locomotive.

== Power supply ==
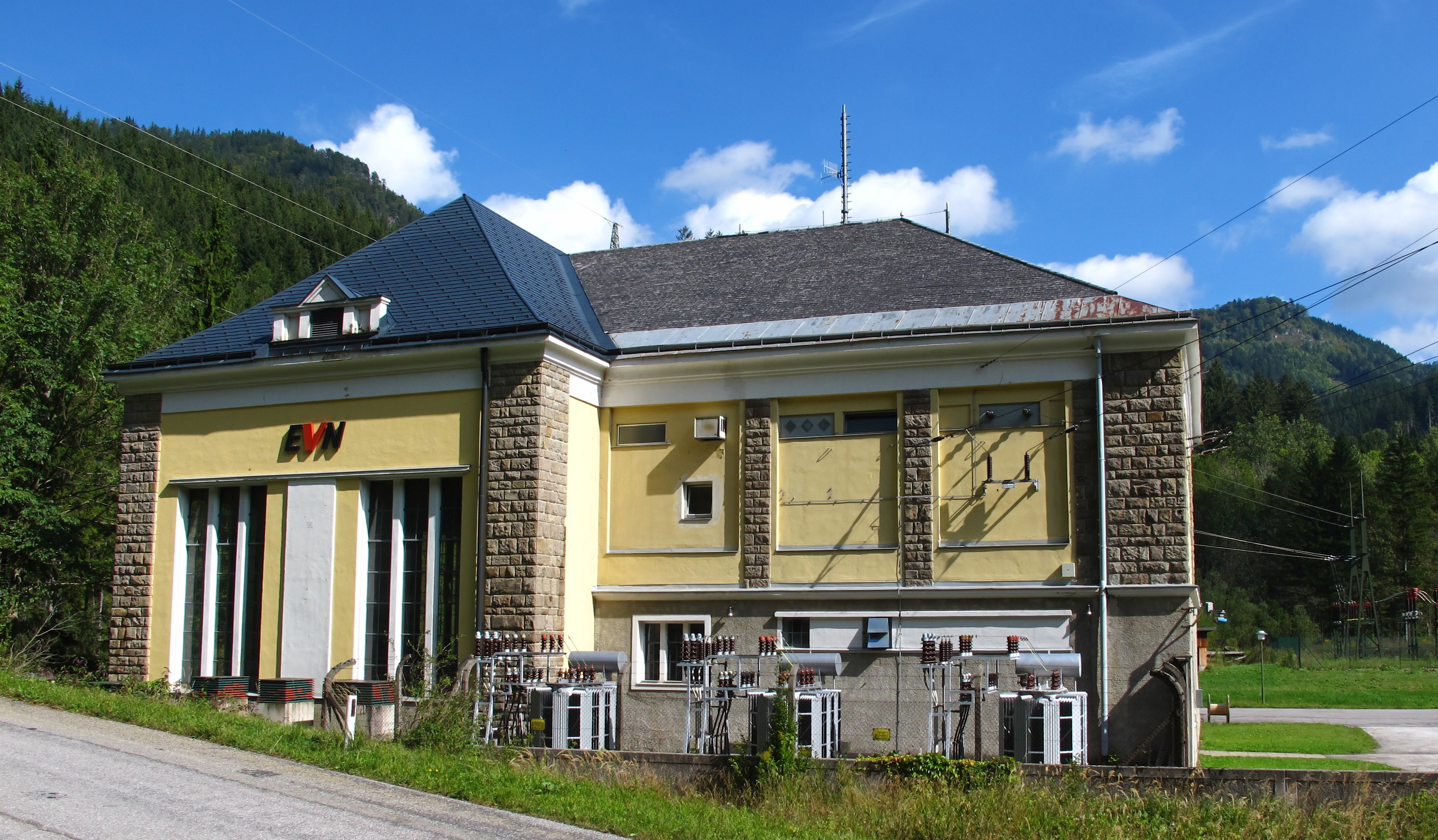
Erlaufboden power station

Due to its history and early provenance, the Mariazell Railway is run on the unusual voltage of 6.5 kV and frequency of 25 Hz, provided by its own supply from the EVN power company.

For the power supply of the whole Mariazell Railway and the region along the line, three 25 Hz multi-phase generators at the Wienerbruck power station were used with an apparent power of 6,600 kVA. This accounts for the single-phase railway supply's apparent power of 4,500 kVA. The equipment is driven by water from the Lassing and the Erlauf. The railway current generated at the Wienerbruck power station at 6.5 kV was partly fed directly into the power lines near the power station, and also partly stepped up to 27 kV to be transmitted to the substations at Kirchberg and Ober-Grafendorf. As a backup against power outages, a power station consisting of two diesel generators, each producing 420 kVA single-phase apparent power, was built at the Alpenbahnhof in St. Pölten.

Right from the beginning, the power cables for public supply and those for the railway supply were mounted on crossbars above the catenary on the wire gantries. Even today – although the public supply has been changed to three-phase at 50 Hz – about 21 km of community power lines are still in service. However, in the 1970s and 1980s, a separate 20-kV line was built between Loich and Frankenfels by the power supplier EVN, which is responsible for public power supply in the area, leaving only the 27-kV line for the railway and the catenary itself on the wire gantries.

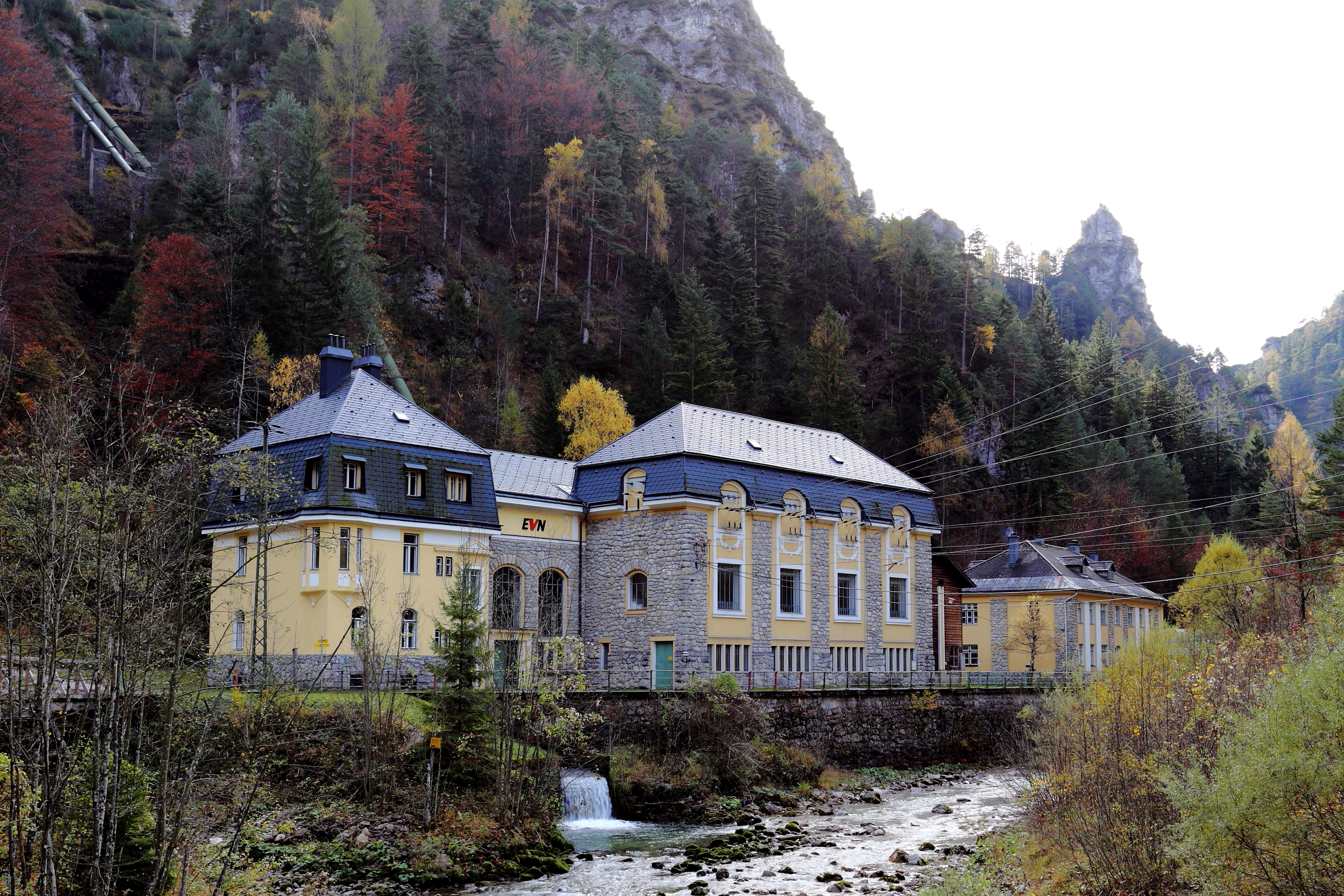
Wienerbruck power station

In 1923, below the Wienerbruck power station, the Stierwaschboden Reservoir and the Erlaufboden power station were built with three generators. In the second half of the 1960s, the aging power generation and distribution system was renewed. The railway power is now usually generated by the 2.8-MVA equipment at Erlaufboden power station. It consists of a synchronous machine for 25 Hz single-phase AC, 50 Hz multiphase, and a Francis turbine. An old, smaller inverter set in Erlaufboden and two old 25 Hz machines in Wienerbruck power station serve as reserves for the railway. Two further generators in Wienerbruck and three in Erlaufboden with all together 11.5 MVA generate 50 Hz multiphase current.

The railway network's backbone nowadays is formed by the 27-kV loop between the two power stations and the newly built Gösing substation as well as the transmission lines from there to the newly built Rabenstein substation. After these facilities went into operation, the direct catenary feed at Wienerbruck and the substations at Kirchberg and Ober-Grafendorf were taken out of service. This improved the power supply on the mountainous section of the line considerably. Nowadays, the switch room at Erlaufboden power station controls its own equipment and that at Wienerbruck power station. The substations at Gösing and Rabenstein are run and overseen remotely by the EVN system operator in the company headquarters at Maria Enzersdorf.

The following facilities are, or have been, operated.

Facility	Type	Opened	Status	MegaWatts	Position	Notes
Erlaufboden	Hydroelectric Power Plant	1924	Active	2.8	47°52′49″N 15°15′55″E	
Erlaufboden	Rotary Converter	1924	Reserve	2.8	47°52′49″N 15°15′55″E	
Gösing	Substation	?	Active	–	47°53′24″N 15°16′49″E	
Kirchberg	Substation	?	Decommissioned	–	48°01′29″N 15°26′02″E	
Ober-Grafendorf	Substation	?	Decommissioned	–	?	
Rabenstein	Substation	?	Active	–	48°04′06″N 15°28′05″E	
St. Pölten Alpenbahnhof	Diesel Power Plant	1909	Decommissioned	?	48°12′01″N 15°36′48″E	
Wienerbruck	Hydroelectric Power Plant	1908	Reserve	4.5	47°51′09″N 15°17′17″E	
Wienerbruck	Substation	?	Decommissioned	–	47°51′18″N 15°18′41″E	
