= Rabenstein Castle =

Rabenstein Castle may refer to:

In Austria:

- Rabenstein Castle (Carinthia), castle ruins near Sankt Paul im Lavanttal
- Rabenstein Castle (Lower Austria), castle ruins in Rabenstein an der Pielach
- Rabenstein Castle (Styria), a castle in Frohnleiten
- Rabenstein Castle (Tyrol), castle ruins in Virgen

In the Czech Republic:

- Rabenštejn Castle (German: Rabenstein), a castle in Vrbno pod Pradědem

In Germany:

- Rabenstein Castle (Upper Franconia), a castle in Ahorntal, Bavaria
- Rabenstein Castle (Brandenburg), a castle in Rabenstein/Fläming in the Potsdam-Mittelmark District
- Rabenstein Castle (Riedenburg), castle ruins in Riedenburg, Bavaria
- Rabenstein Castle (Rhön), castle ruins in the Rhön Mountains
- Rabenstein Castle (Saxony), a castle in the Chemnitz suburb of Rabenstein
- Rabenstein Castle (Wirsberg), castle ruins in Wirsberg, Bavaria

== See also ==
- Rabenstein
- Rabenstein an der Pielach
- Rabenstein (Kellerwald)
