= Hans Carl von Carlowitz =

German accountant and mining administrator (1645–1714)

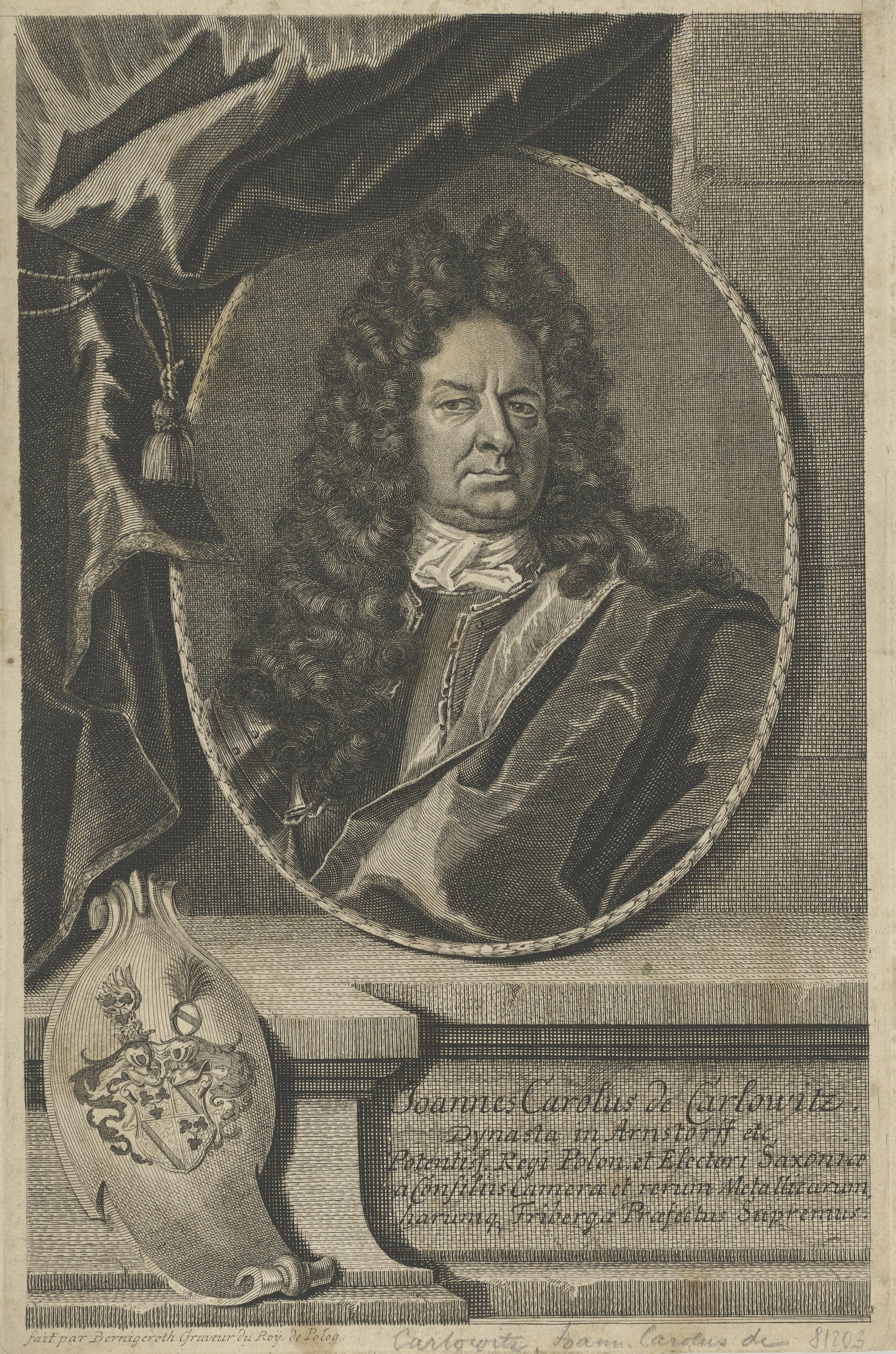
Copperplate engraving of Hans Carl von Carlowitz by Martin Bernigeroth, 1733

Hans Carl von Carlowitz or Hannß Carl von Carlowitz (24 December 1645 – 3 March 1714), was a Saxon tax accountant and mining administrator. His book Sylvicultura oeconomica, oder haußwirthliche Nachricht und Naturmäßige Anweisung zur wilden Baum-Zucht (1713) was the first comprehensive treatise about forestry. He approached forestry from the fears of a shortage of wood needed for the mining industry. He coined the term Nachhaltigkeit, now translated as "sustainability" while referring to the use of forests and is considered to be the father of sustainable yield forestry.

== Life ==
Von Carlowitz was born in Oberrabenstein close to Chemnitz, nowadays a suburb of Chemnitz. He was the son of Saxon forest master Georg Carl von Carlowitz. The Thirty Years' War had caused much trouble and the Rabenstein Castle was also damaged leading to the family moving to Altschönfels in 1652. Young von Carlowitz grew up in the estate of Arnsdorf. In 1659, he studied at the Lycei Halensis. Fiver years later he went to study law and public administration in Jena, learned foreign languages, travelled as part of the grand tour to France, Russia and Italy.

In 1671, he joined his father who was involved in settling disputes on the border with Bohemia. In 1672, he became a chamberlain and again assisted his father. Elector Johann Georg II appointed him as a mining inspector in 1679. In 1711, he became Oberberghauptmann in charge of mining at the court of Kursachsen in Freiberg (Sachsen). Freiberg, which is located in the foothills of the Ore Mountains, was known for its silver mines. In this post, he was responsible, among other things, for the supply of timber to the mining industry, which employed about ten thousand miners at the time. He married Ursula Margaretha, daughter of Christoph Dietrich von Bose in 1675. They had five children. He died in Freiberg.

== Sylvicultura Oeconomica ==
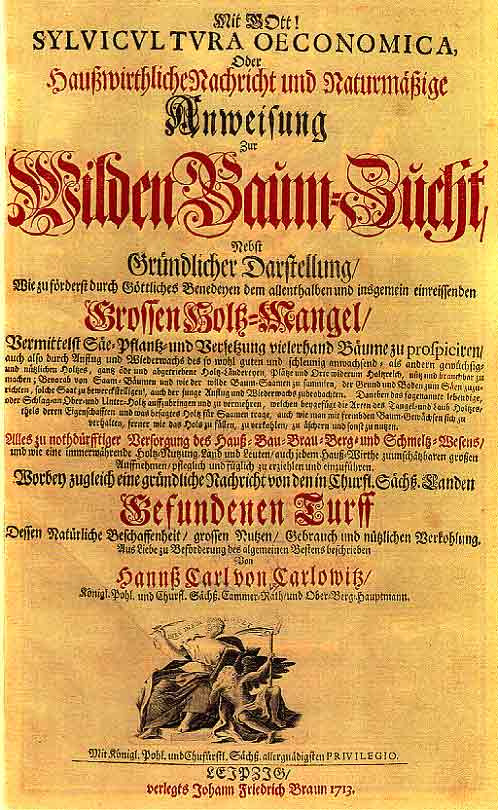
Cover of Sylvicultura oeconomica, oder haußwirthliche Nachricht und Naturmäßige Anweisung zur wilden Baum-Zucht of 1713

The idea of sustainability, wherever it occurs in the history, emerges in time of crisis and scarcity. Around 1700, the mining industry and livelihood of thousands was threatened in Saxony. It was not that the mines had been exhausted of their ores, the problem was an acute scarcity of timber. The mining industry and smelting of ores had consumed whole forests. In the vicinity of places of mining activity the old growth forests had disappeared completely. Trees had been cut at unsustainable rates for decades without efforts to restore the forests. First, the river systems in the Erzgebirge was engineered, so logs could be transported from ever more distant forest areas, but these measures only postponed the crisis. The prices for timber rose ever more, which led to bankruptcy and closure of parts of the mining industry. Von Carlowitz was raised in and influenced by this environment. He traveled widely in his youth and learned much from the forced discipline of the French minister Jean Baptiste Colbert, who had enacted a forestry reform in France. He may also have come across John Evelyn's work Sylva (1662).

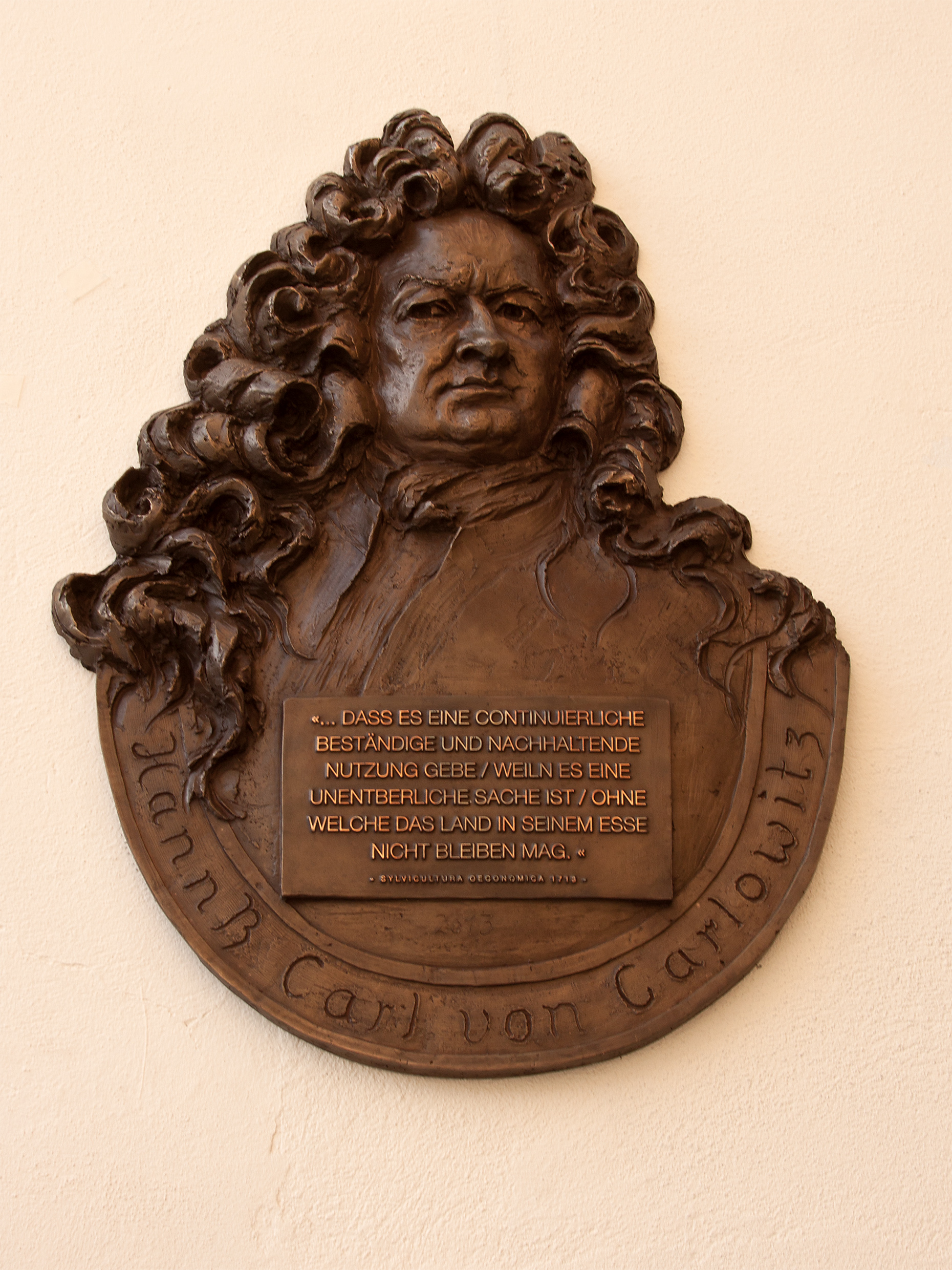
Memorial in Freiberg

His importance as author is in the fact that he was the first one who comprehensively wrote about forestry. His treatise is a compilation of the knowledge about forest management at the time. He used his own experience to expand the scientific knowledge base that remained after the devastation of the Thirty Years' War. Hans Carl von Carlowitz was the first one to clearly formulate the concept of sustainability in forestry (pages 105–106 in the Sylvicultura Oeconomica).

"Wird derhalben die größte Kunst/Wissenschaft/Fleiß und Einrichtung hiesiger Lande darinnen beruhen / wie eine sothane Conservation und Anbau des Holtzes anzustellen / daß es eine continuierliche beständige und nachhaltende Nutzung gebe / weiln es eine unentberliche Sache ist / ohne welche das Land in seinem Esse nicht bleiben mag."

The full title of his book loosely translates as:

Sylvicultura Oeconomica, or the economic news and instructions for the natural growing of wild trees, besides thorough explanation how with gods good will the ever stronger scarcity of timber is to be managed by sowing, growing and planting of seedlings, also through wild and planned cultivation of a once cut and barren land can again be made useful as timber land - through the collection of seeds from seed trees, the preparation of soil for sowing and the care of seedlings. Besides, how to multiply the timber harvest at every stage of growth, the types of broad-leaf and needle trees and their seeds, also how to manage foreign kinds of trees, and further how to fell trees and make charcoal or other uses from the wood. To be the best utility for the heating, building, brewing, mining and smelting activities requires the careful management of sustainable forestry resources.

== Sources ==
- Grober, Ulrich (1999) Der erfinder der Nachhaltigkeit. Die Zeit Nr. 48/ 25.11.1999, page 98 (German)
- Reprint of the 2. edition from 1732, Verlag Kessel, ISBN 978-3-941300-19-4, Sample preview
