= ÖBB Class 2043 =

Austrian diesel locomotive class

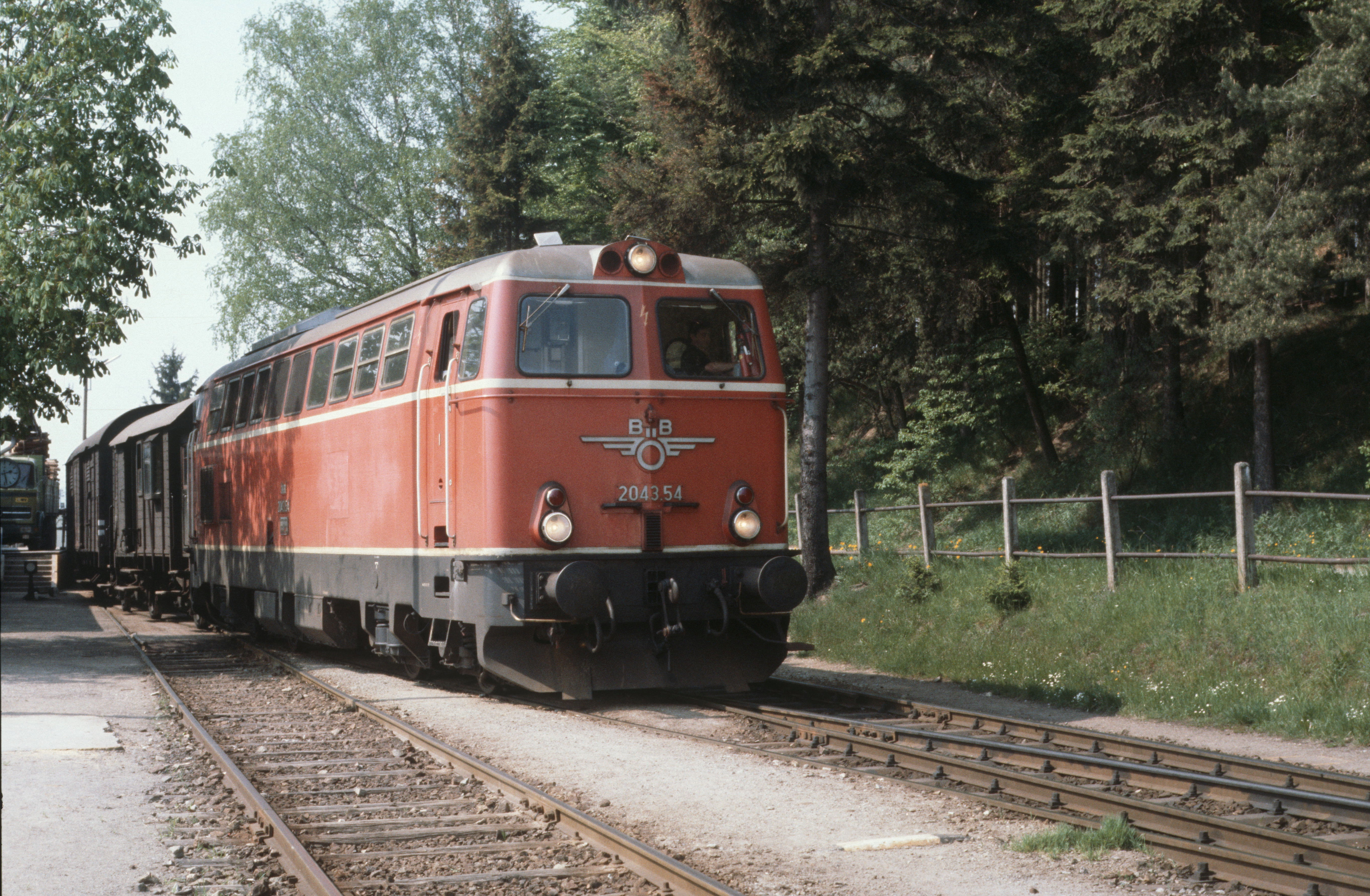
- ÖBB 2043.54 shunting a goods train on a station in the Waldviertel region in Lower Austria.
Type and origin
- Power type: Diesel-hydraulic
- Builder: Jenbacher Werke
- Build date: 1964–1977
- Total produced: 77
Specifications
- Configuration
  - AAR: B-B
- Gauge: 1,435 mm (4 ft 8 1/2 in)
- Wheel diameter: 950 mm (3 ft 1 in)
- Length: 14.76 m (48 ft 5 in)–15.76 m (51 ft 8 in)
- Loco weight: 68 t
- Prime mover: Jenbach LM1500
Performance figures
- Maximum speed: 100 km/h (62 mph)
- Power output: 1,100 kW (1,475 hp)
Career
- Operators: Austrian Federal Railways; NÖVOG
- Disposition: Austria

The ÖBB Class 2043 is a class of diesel-hydraulic locomotives operated by Austrian Federal Railways (ÖBB) in Austria.

== Technical specifications ==
The locomotives have a B-B wheel arrangement and are powered by Jenbach LM1500 diesel motors. They are equipped with a Voith hydraulic transmission. Four locomotives were retrofitted with a magnetic track brake system.

== History ==
A total of 77 locomotives have been built by Jenbacher Werke. Some locomotives are also operated by Növog.

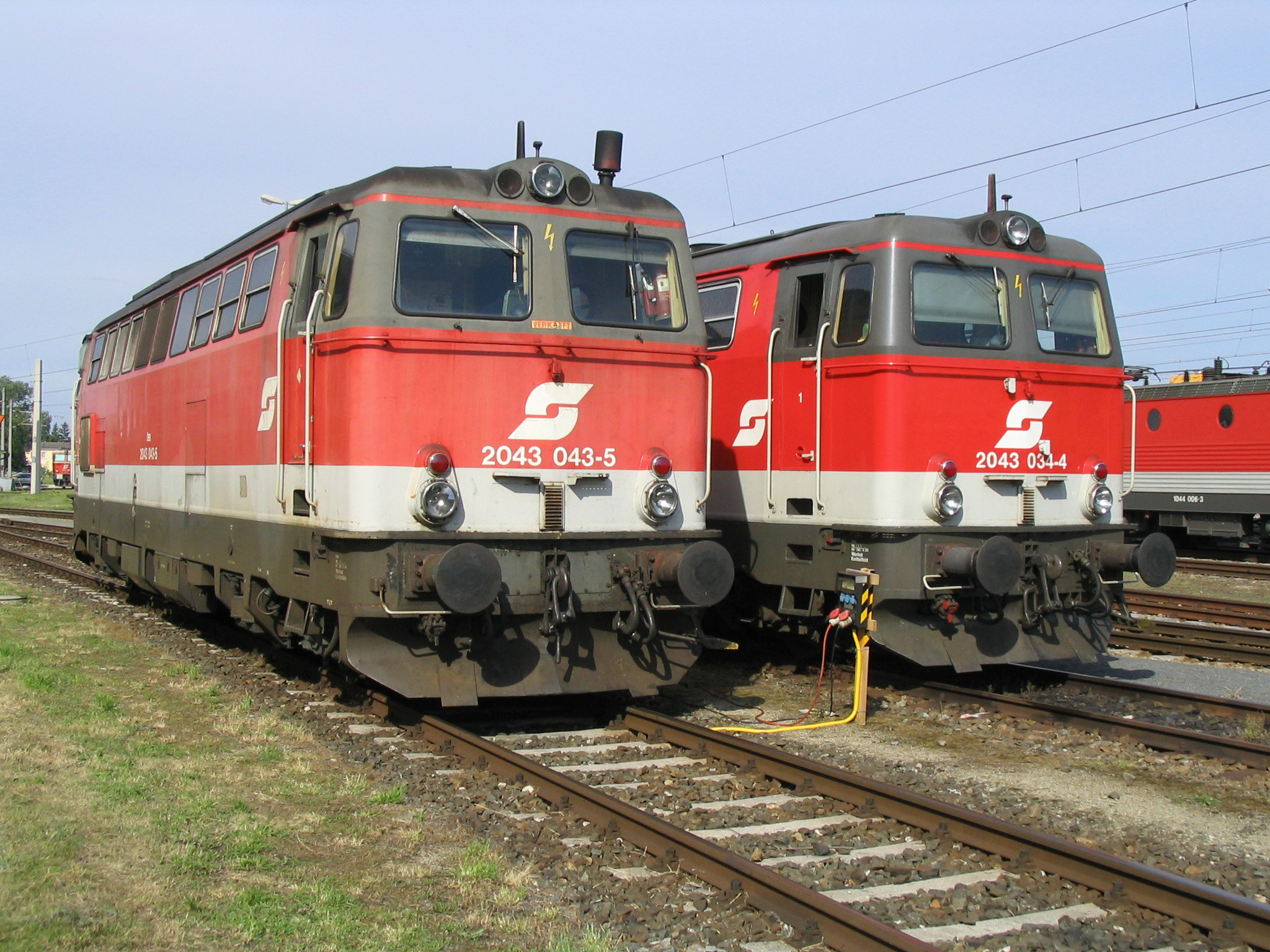
Two Class 2043 locomotives in June 2004

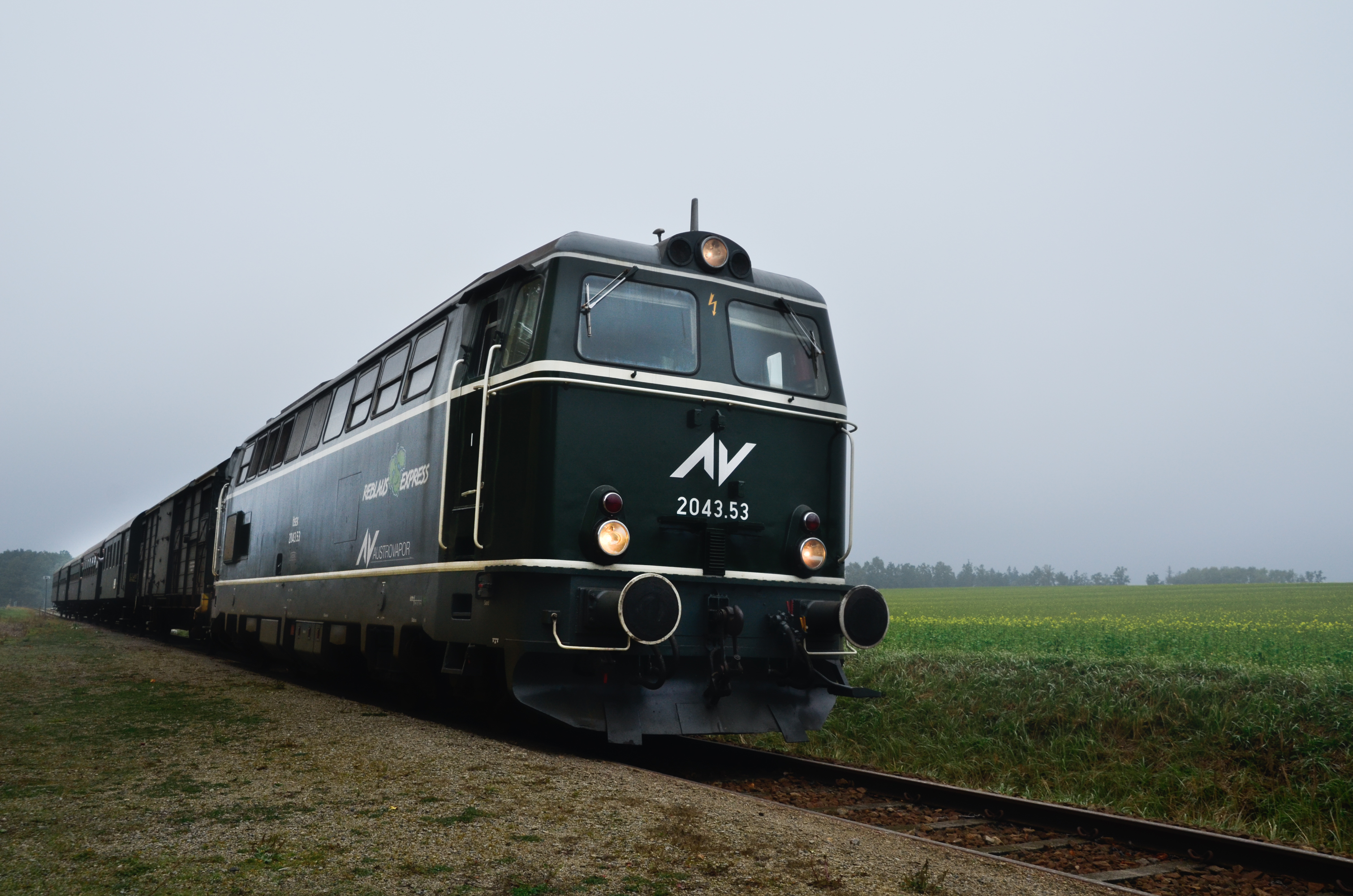
2043.53 operated on the Retz–Drosendorf railway

ÖBB 2043.044-3 at Eisenbahnmuseum Strasshof, Austria
