= Donauuferbahn =

Donauuferbahn (lit. 'Danube bank railway line') is the name of two railway lines in Austria:

- Donauuferbahn (Vienna), in Vienna
- Donauuferbahn (Wachau), in the Wachau valley in Lower Austria
