= Donauuferbahn (Wachau) =

Railway line in Lower Austria

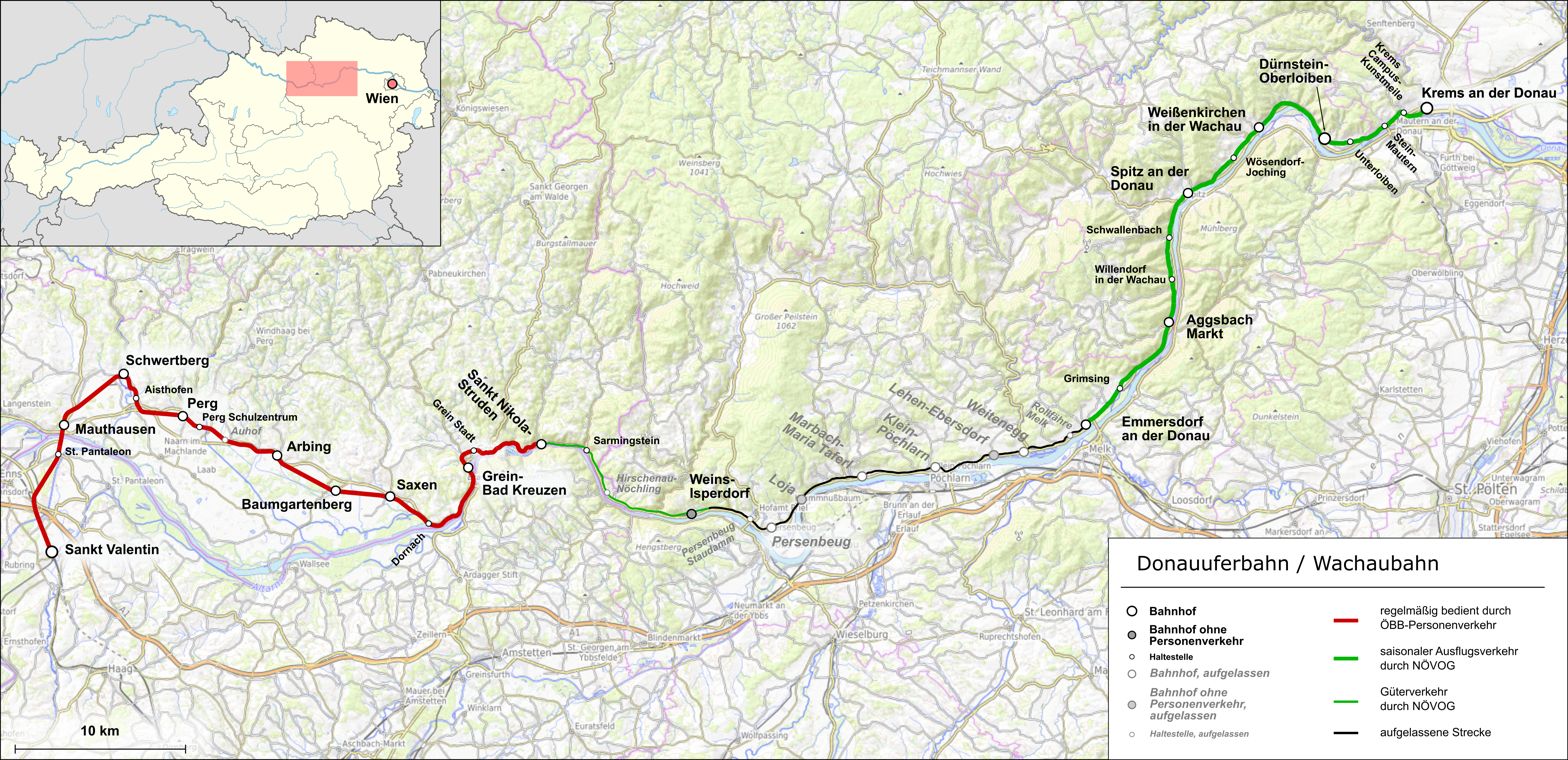
- Route map

Overview
- Line number: 133
- Termini: Krems an der Donau; Mauthausen

Technical
- Line length: 108 km (67 mi)
- Number of tracks: 1
- Track gauge: 1,435 mm (4 ft 8 1/2 in) standard gauge

The Donauuferbahn (lit. 'Danube bank railway line') is a railway line in Lower Austria. It runs 108 kilometres (67 mi) from Krems an der Donau to Mauthausen, near St. Valentin. The line is no longer contiguous; 21.9 kilometres (13.6 mi) in the middle between Weins and Weitenegg has been abandoned. Austrian Federal Railways (ÖBB) operates services on the western end; NÖVOG operates seasonal services on the eastern end.

== Route ==
The eastern end of the Donauuferbahn is at Krems an der Donau railway station, where it meets the Absdorf-Hippersdorf–Krems an der Donau and Herzogenburg–Krems railway lines. From there, the line runs 38.3 kilometres (23.8 mi) west along the north bank of the Danube to Weitenegg. This part of the line is also known as the Wachaubahn after the Wachau valley.

Between Weitenegg and Weins the line is abandoned. The track resumes at Weins, although is freight-only until St. Nikola-Struden. The line continues running west, following the river, until Mauthausen, where it connects with the St. Valentin–České Budějovice railway line. That line is now abandoned north of Mauthausen; the remainder runs south, crossing the Danube to reach St. Valentin.

== Operation ==
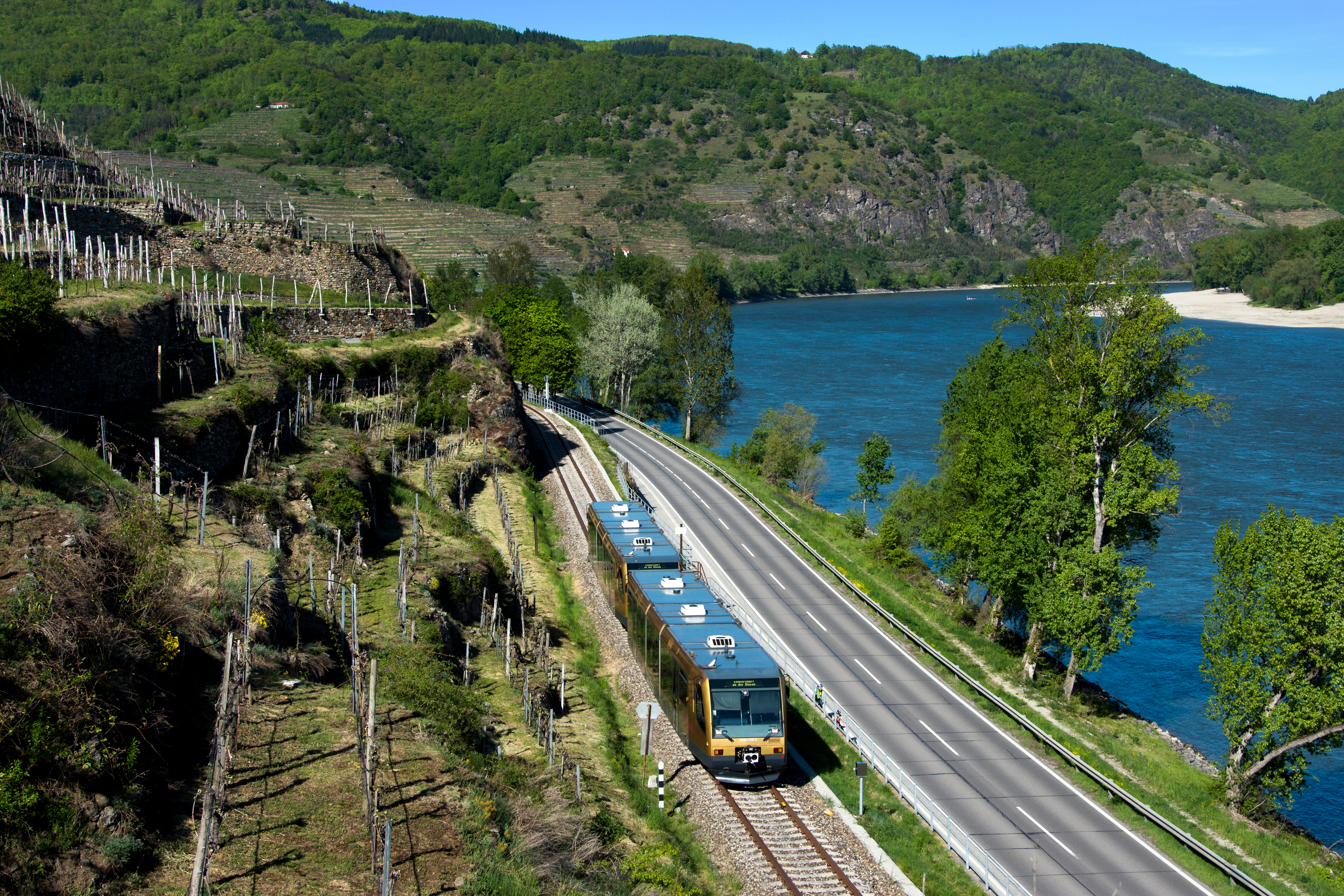
A NÖVOG RegioSprinter north of Weißenkirchen in 2021.

On the eastern end, NÖVOG runs seasonal trains between Krems an der Donau and Emmersdorf an der Donau. As of the December 2022 timetable change, this service consists of four round-trips per day on weekends between March and May, increasing to daily service between May and November.

On the western end, Austrian Federal Railways (ÖBB) operates hourly Regionalzug services between St. Nikola-Struden and St. Valentin. On weekdays, every other service runs as a Regional-Express to Linz, bypassing St. Valentin.
