= Ober-Grafendorf =

- Municipality
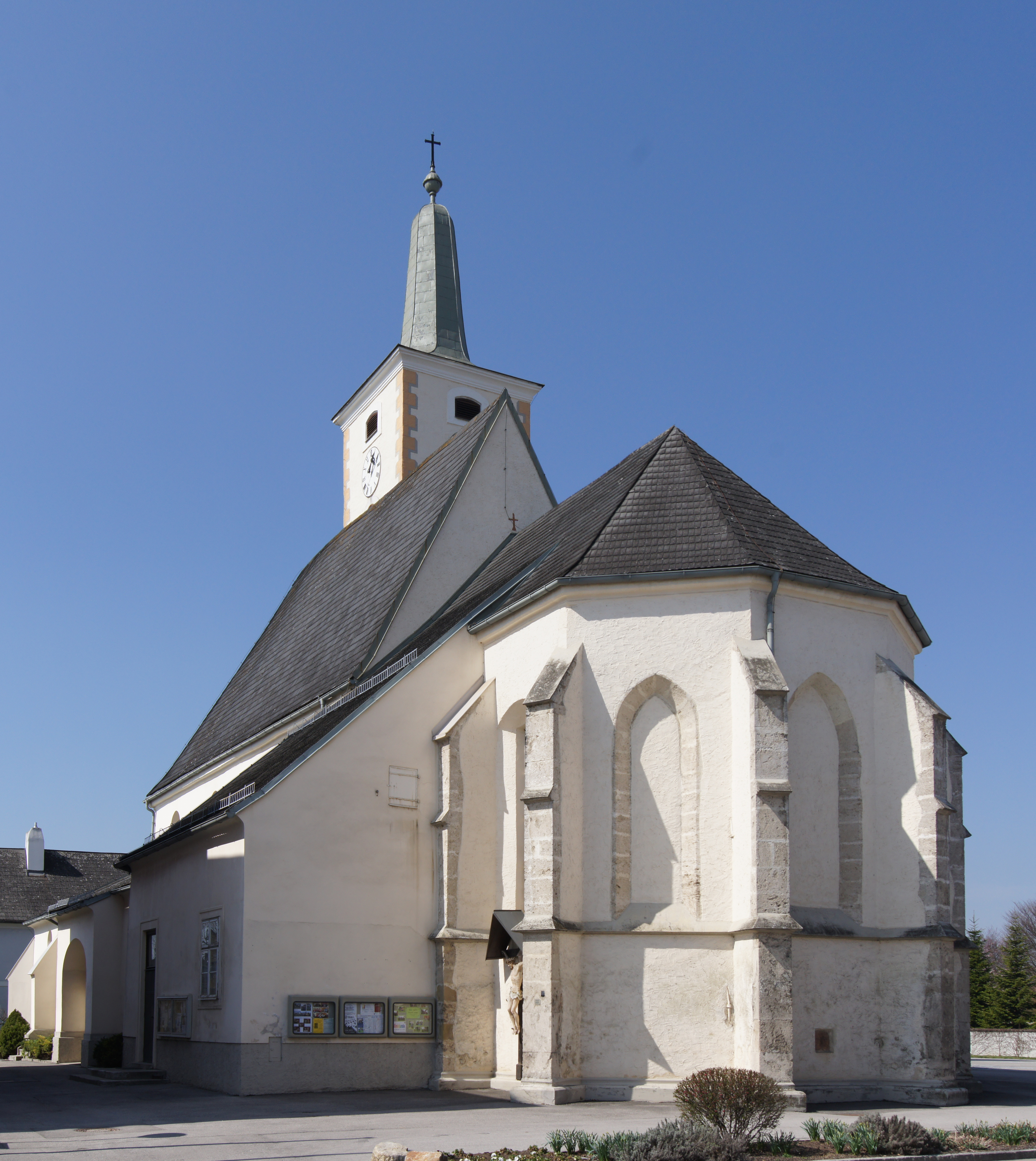
- Ober-Grafendorf parish church

- Coat of arms

- Location within Austria
- Coordinates: 48°09′00″N 15°32′00″E
- Country: Austria
- State: Lower Austria
- District: Sankt Pölten-Land

Government
  - Mayor: Rainer Handlfinger (SPÖ)

Area
  - Total: 24.58 km^{2} (9.49 sq mi)
- Elevation: 280 m (920 ft)

Population (2018-01-01)
  - Total: 4,544
  - Density: 184.9/km^{2} (478.8/sq mi)
- Time zone: UTC+1 (CET)
  - Summer (DST): UTC+2 (CEST)
- Postal code: 3200
- Area code: 02747
- Vehicle registration: PL
- Website: www.ober-grafendorf.at

Ober-Grafendorf is a municipality in the district of Sankt Pölten-Land in the Austrian state of Lower Austria.

== Population ==
Historical population
Year	Pop.	±%
1971	4,109	—
1981	4,471	+8.8%
1991	4,551	+1.8%
2001	4,650	+2.2%
