= Rabenstein Castle (Saxony) =

Castle in Chemnitz, Germany

- Burg Rabenstein
- Chemnitz-Rabenstein
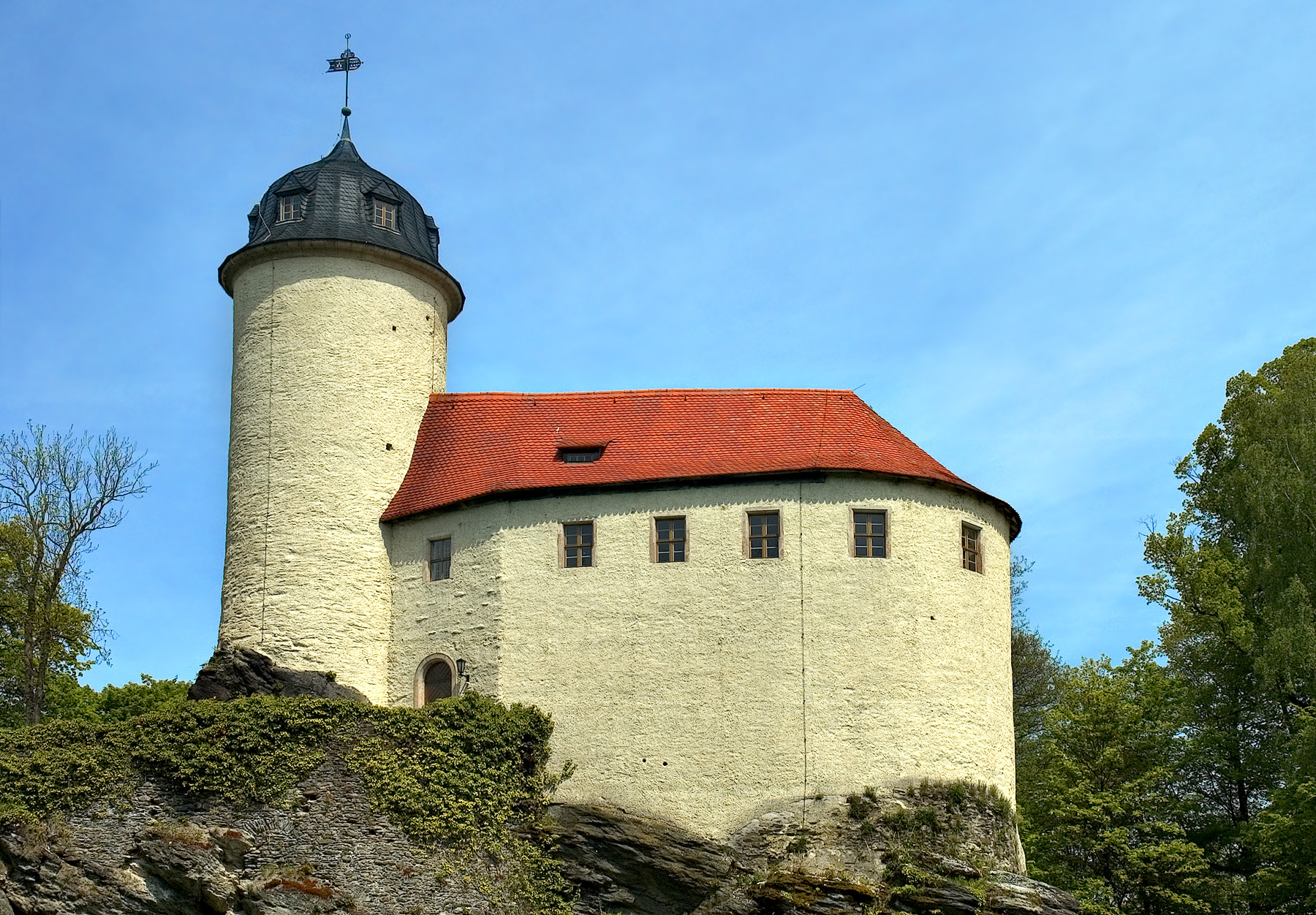
- Burg Rabenstein

Site information
- Type: Hill Castle
- Code: DE-SN
- Condition: only part of the upper castle remaining

Location
- Coordinates: 50°49′59.2″N 12°49′5.69″E

Site history
- Built: ca 1100 - 1200

Garrison information
- Occupants: Nobility

Rabenstein Castle (German:Burg Rabenstein) is the smallest Medieval castle in Saxony. It is located in the Chemnitz suburb of Rabenstein and belongs to the Chemnitz Castle Hill Museum.

== History ==
The hill castle Rabenstein was first mentioned in 1336 in a document from Louis IV, Holy Roman Emperor in which he promised it as a fief to his son-in-law Frederick II, Margrave of Meissen, in case the line of Waldenburg were to die out without male heirs.

At this time the castle was larger than the current. The castle walls consisted of a 180 m long wall, which enclosed an area of two hectares.
