= NÖVOG =

Lower Austrian public transport operator

NÖVOG is a public transport operator, owned by the provincial government of Lower Austria. It holds concessions for a number of regional and heritage railways.

== Operations ==
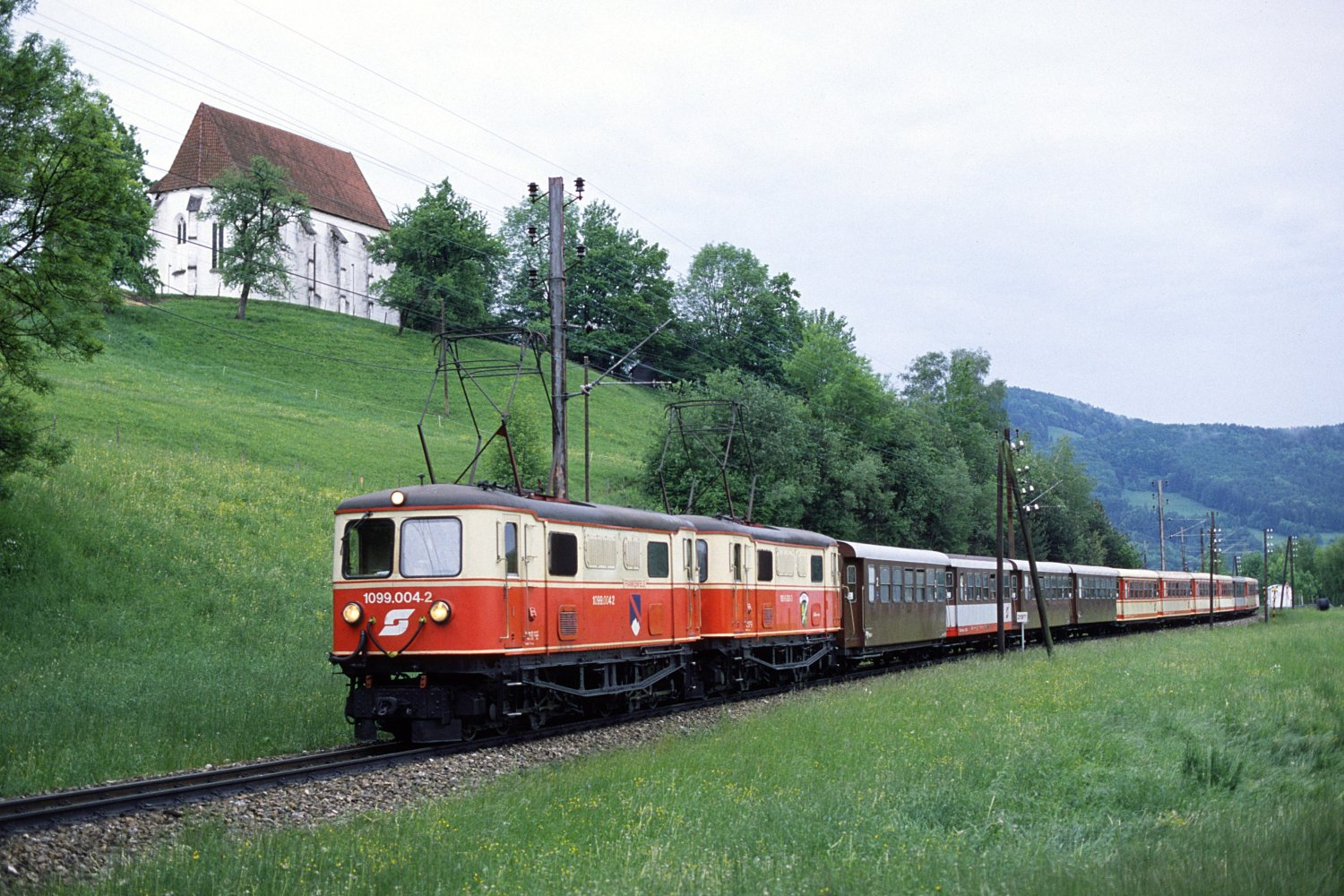
Mariazell Railway

NÖVOG's transport concessions include:

- Wiesel buses: A regional bus service, with a fleet including 47 new Setra buses
- Light rail services in Waidhofen/Ybbs
- Mariazell Railway, taken over from ÖBB in December 2010
- The rack railway section of Schneeberg Railway, between Puchberg am Schneeberg and Hochschneeberg
- Waldviertelbahn
