= Rabenstein an der Pielach =

- Municipality
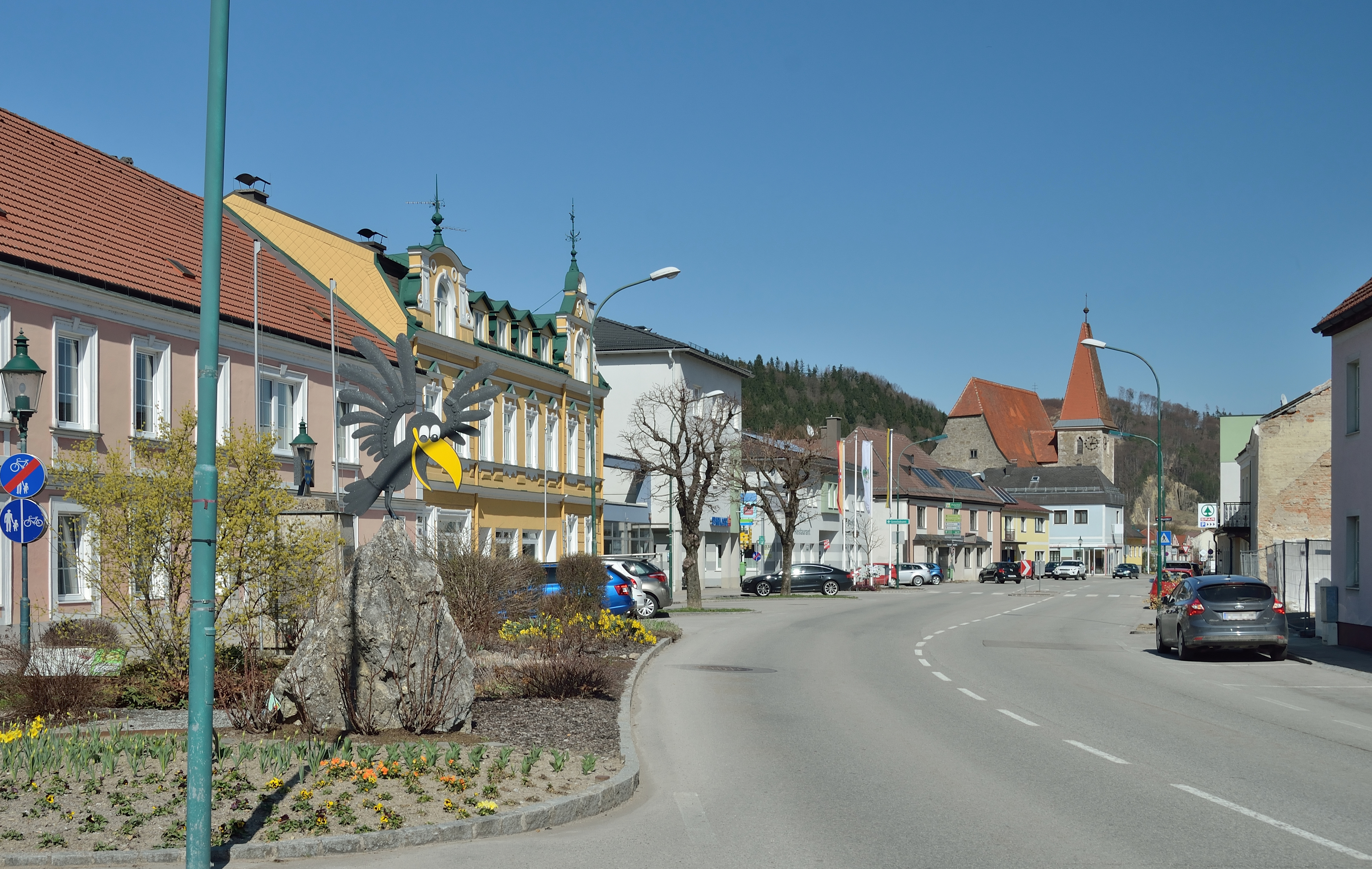

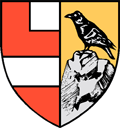
- Coat of arms

- Location within Austria
- Coordinates: 48°03′56″N 15°28′02″E
- Country: Austria
- State: Lower Austria
- District: Sankt Pölten-Land

Government
  - Mayor: Kurt Wittmann (ÖVP)

Area
  - Total: 36.23 km^{2} (13.99 sq mi)
- Elevation: 344 m (1,129 ft)

Population (2018-01-01)
  - Total: 2,560
  - Density: 70.7/km^{2} (183/sq mi)
- Time zone: UTC+1 (CET)
  - Summer (DST): UTC+2 (CEST)
- Postal code: 3203
- Area code: 02723
- Vehicle registration: PL
- Website: www.rabenstein.cc

Rabenstein an der Pielach is a municipality in the district of Sankt Pölten-Land in Lower Austria, Austria.

== Geography ==
Rabenstein an der Pielach lies in the middle of the Pielach valley in the Mostviertel in Lower Austria. About 45.51 percent of the municipality is forested.

== History ==
Franz König, Cardinal of the Catholic Church, was born in the village Warth in Rabenstein an der Pielach.
