= Herzogenburg Monastery =

Coordinates: 48°17′11″N 15°41′45″E

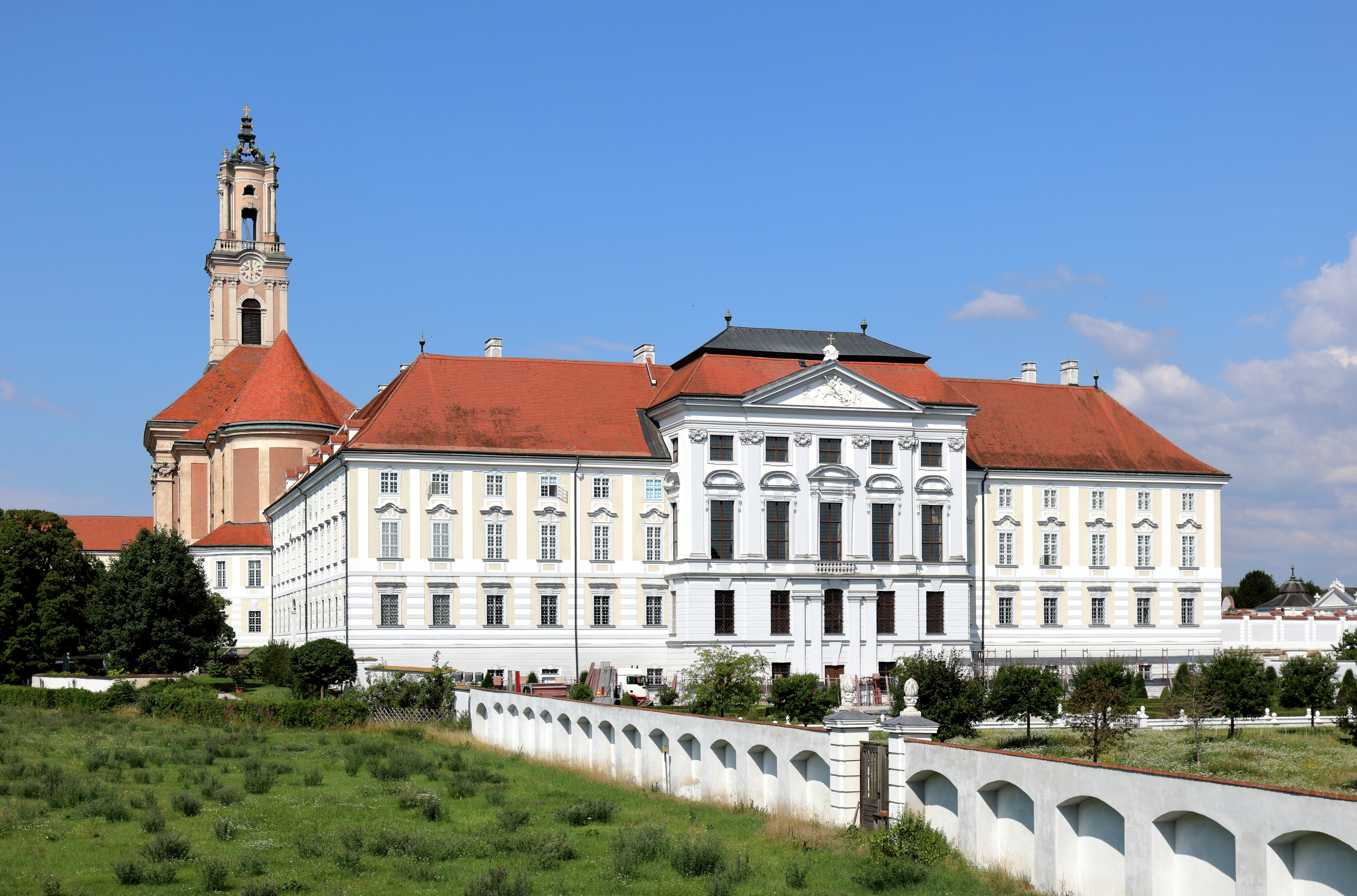
Herzogenburg Monastery

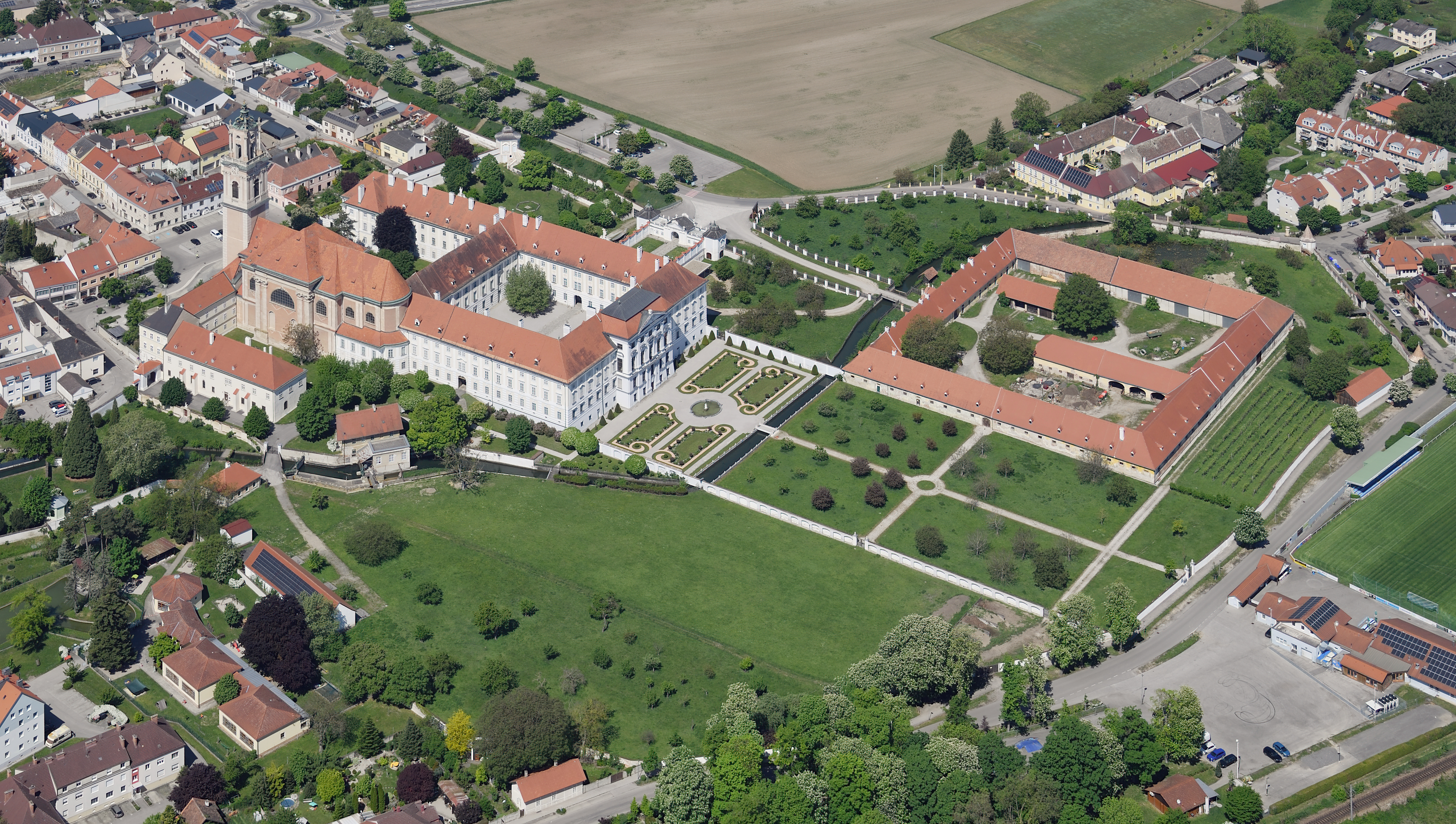
Aerial view of Herzogenburg Monastery and its gardens

Herzogenburg Monastery (German: Stift Herzogenburg) is an Augustinian monastery located in Herzogenburg in Lower Austria. Founded in 1112 by Augustinian Canons, the monastery was refurbished in the Baroque style in 1714 by Jakob Prandtauer, Johann Bernhard Fischer von Erlach, and Josef Munggenast.

== History ==
The monastery was founded in 1112 by Ulrich I, Bishop of Passau, at St. Georgen an der Traisen, now in Traismauer, at the confluence of the Traisen with the Danube. In 1244 because of frequent flooding it was moved up-river towards Herzogenburg. From 1714 the buildings were refurbished in the Baroque style by Jakob Prandtauer, Johann Bernhard Fischer von Erlach, and Josef Munggenast. The monastery was able to survive the dissolutions enforced by Emperor Joseph II in the late 18th century. Until 1783 the monastery was in the Diocese of Passau, afterwards in the Diocese of St. Pölten.

== Monastery Church ==
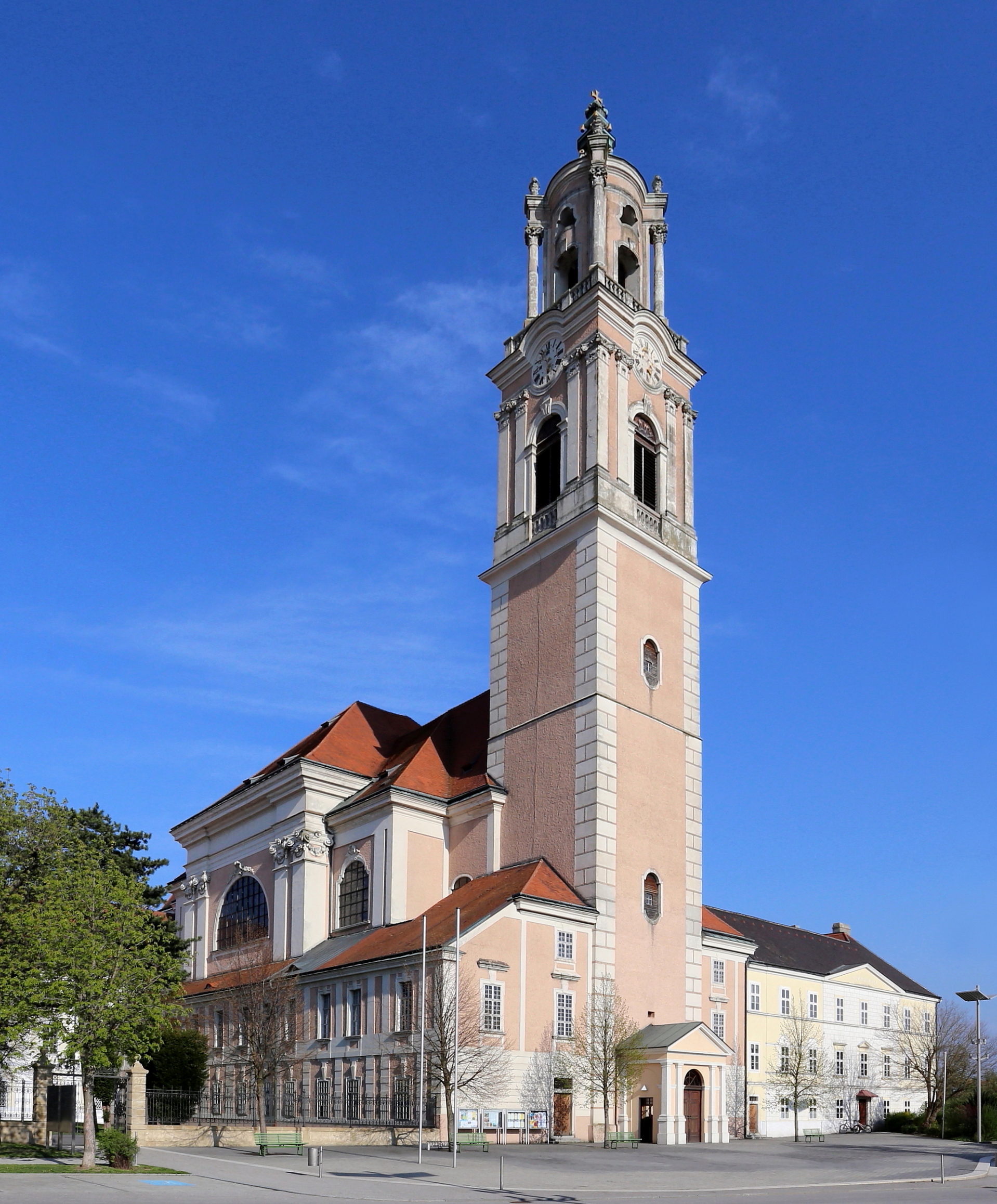
Herzogenburg Monastery Church

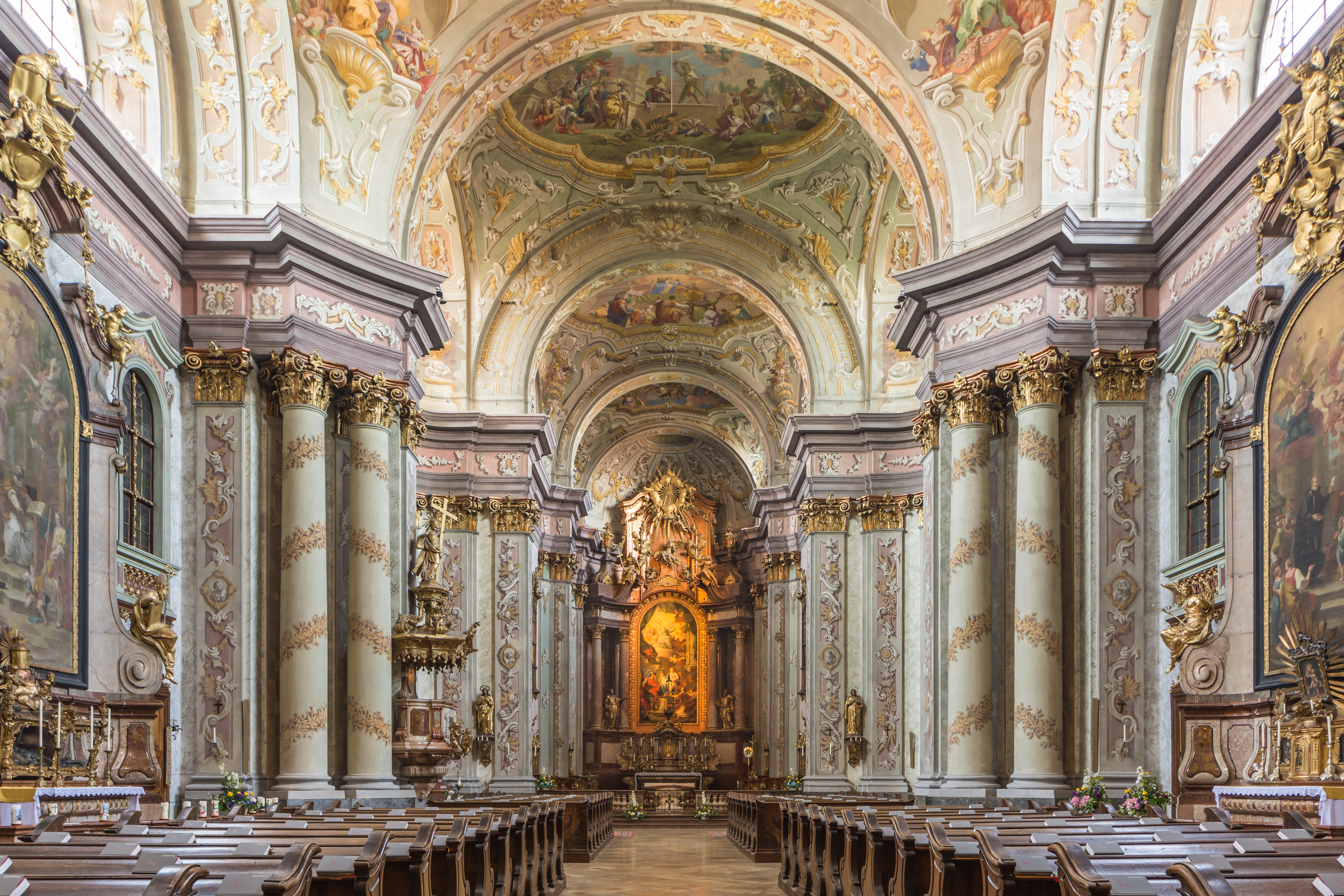
Herzogenburg Monastery Church interior

The monastery church was established in about 1014 by Emperor Henry II and is dedicated to Saint Stephen the Protomartyr (after the patron of Passau Cathedral). In 1112 bishop Ulrich I gave the benefice of Herzogenburg to his newly founded monastery at St. Georgen, which moved to Herzogenburg in 1244.

There are few remains of the Gothic church (the portal and the second storey of the tower). The architect of the present church building was Franz Munggenast (son of Josef Munggenast). The rebuilt church was dedicated on 2 October 1785 and was the last significant Baroque church built in Austria.

== Art collection ==
The emphasis of the collection is on late Gothic works such as panel paintings, sculptures and stained glass windows. The great banqueting hall, the treasury, and the monastic library, as well as the coin cabinet, underline the art-historical importance of the priory in Lower Austria. The Baroque picture gallery is also notable, and does not only contain religious works. A particular curiosity is a well-preserved Roman helmet, dating from about 150 A.D., which was found in a gravel pit in the vicinity.

== Provosts ==
1. Wisinto (1112–1117)
2. Raffoldus (1117–1130)
3. Ludger (1130–1148)
4. Hartwig (1148–1160)
5. Adalbert (1160–1180)
6. Berthold (1180–1191)
7. Wisinto II. (1191–1204)
8. Albert (1204–1213)
9. Hermann (1213–1214)
10. Heinrich (1214–1228)
11. Herbord (1228–1242)
12. Engelschalk (1242–1267)
13. Ortlof (1267–1285)
14. Ekhard (1285–1288)
15. Wolfker von Wielandstal (1288–1310)
16. Trost (1310–1330)
17. Herlieb von der Mühl (1330–1340)
18. Siegfried von Wildungsmauer (1340–1361)
19. Nikolaus I. Payger (1361–1374)
20. Johannes I. Schnabl (1374–1377)
21. Johannes II. (1377–1378)
22. Jakob I. (1378–1391)
23. Martin I. (1391–1399)
24. Martin II. Schenk (1399–1401)
25. Johannes III. (1401–1433)
26. Johannes IV. (1433–1457)
27. Ludwig Gössel (1457–1465)
28. Wolfgang (1465–1468)
29. Thomas I. Kasbauch (1468–1484)
30. Georg I. Eisner (1484–1513)
31. Kaspar Grinzinger (1513–1517)
32. Johannes V. Bernhard (1517–1533)
33. Bernhard I. Schönberger (1533–1541)
34. Philipp von Maugis (1541–1550)
35. Bartholomäus von Cataneis (1550–1562)
36. Johannes VI. Pülzer (1563–1569)
37. Johannes VII. Glaz (1569–1572)
38. Jakob II. Reisser (1573–1577)
39. Georg II. Brenner (1578–1590)
40. Paul Zynkh (1591–1602)
41. Johannes VIII. Rausch (1603–1604)
42. Ulrich Höllwirth (1604–1608)
43. Melchior Kniepichler (1609–1615)
44. Johannes IX. Hanolt (1619–1621)
45. Nikolaus II. Hay (1621 ||
46. Martin III. Müller (1621–1640)
47. Johannes X. Bauer (1640–1653)
48. Joseph I. Kupferschein (1653–1669)
49. Anton Sardena (1669–1687)
50. Maximilian I. Herb (1687–1709)
51. Wilhelm Schmerling (1709–1721)
52. Leopold von Planta (1721–1740)
53. Frigdian I. Knecht (1740–1775)
54. Stephan Peschka (1775–1779)
55. Augustin Beyer (1779–1780)
56. Michael Teufel (1781–1809)
57. Aquilin Leuthner (1811–1832)
58. Bermhard II. Kluwick (1832–1843)
59. Karl Stix (1843–1847)
60. Josef II. Neugebauer (1847–1856)
61. Norbert Zach (1857–1887)
62. Frigdian II. Schmolk (1888–1912)
63. Georg III. Baumgartner (1913–1927)
64. Ubald Steiner (1927–1946)
65. Georg IV. Hahnl (1946–1963)
66. Thomas II. Zettel (1963–1969)
67. Clemens Moritz (1969–1979)
68. Maximilian II. Fürnsinn (1979)

== Gallery ==
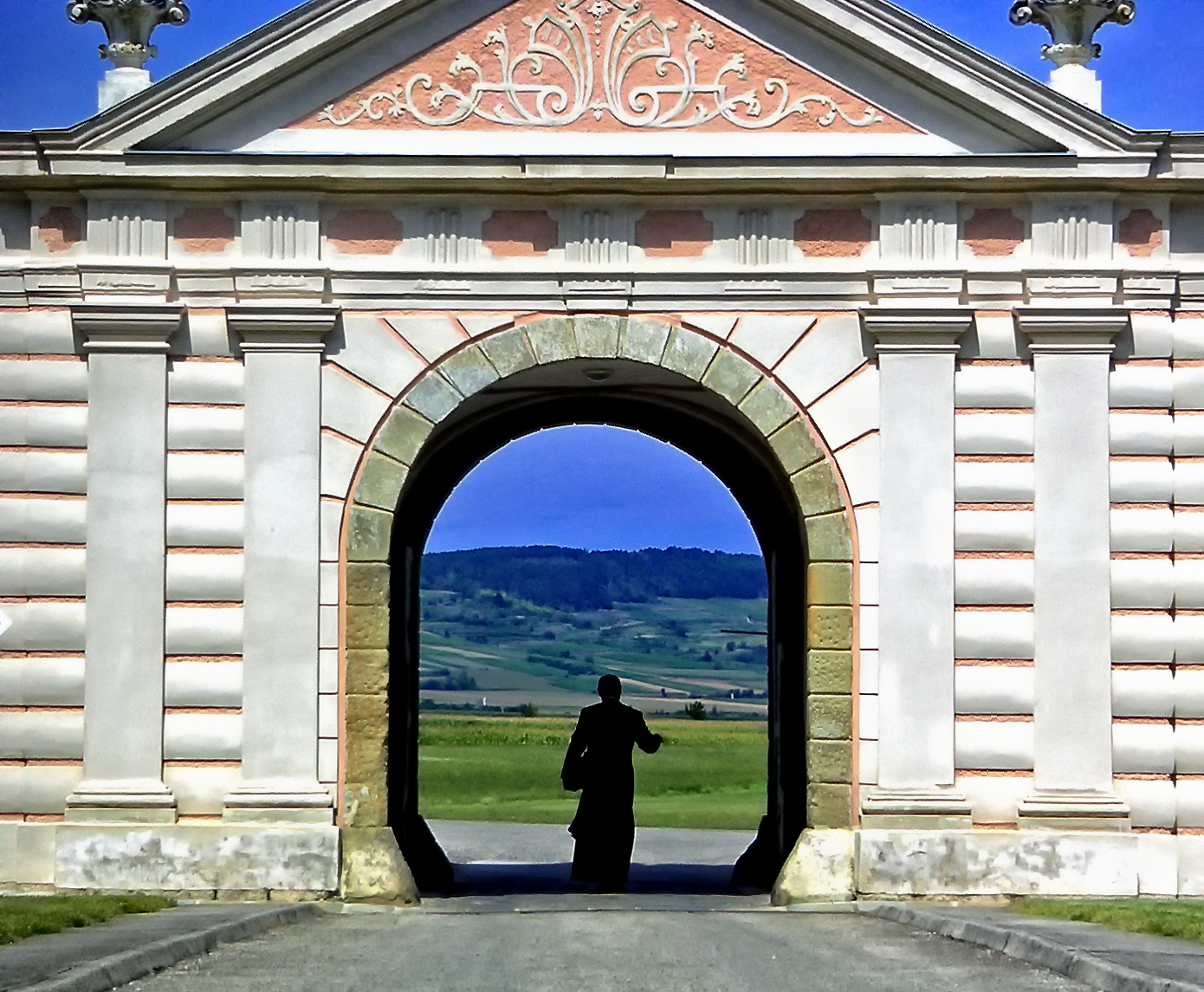
Herzogenburg Monastery entrance

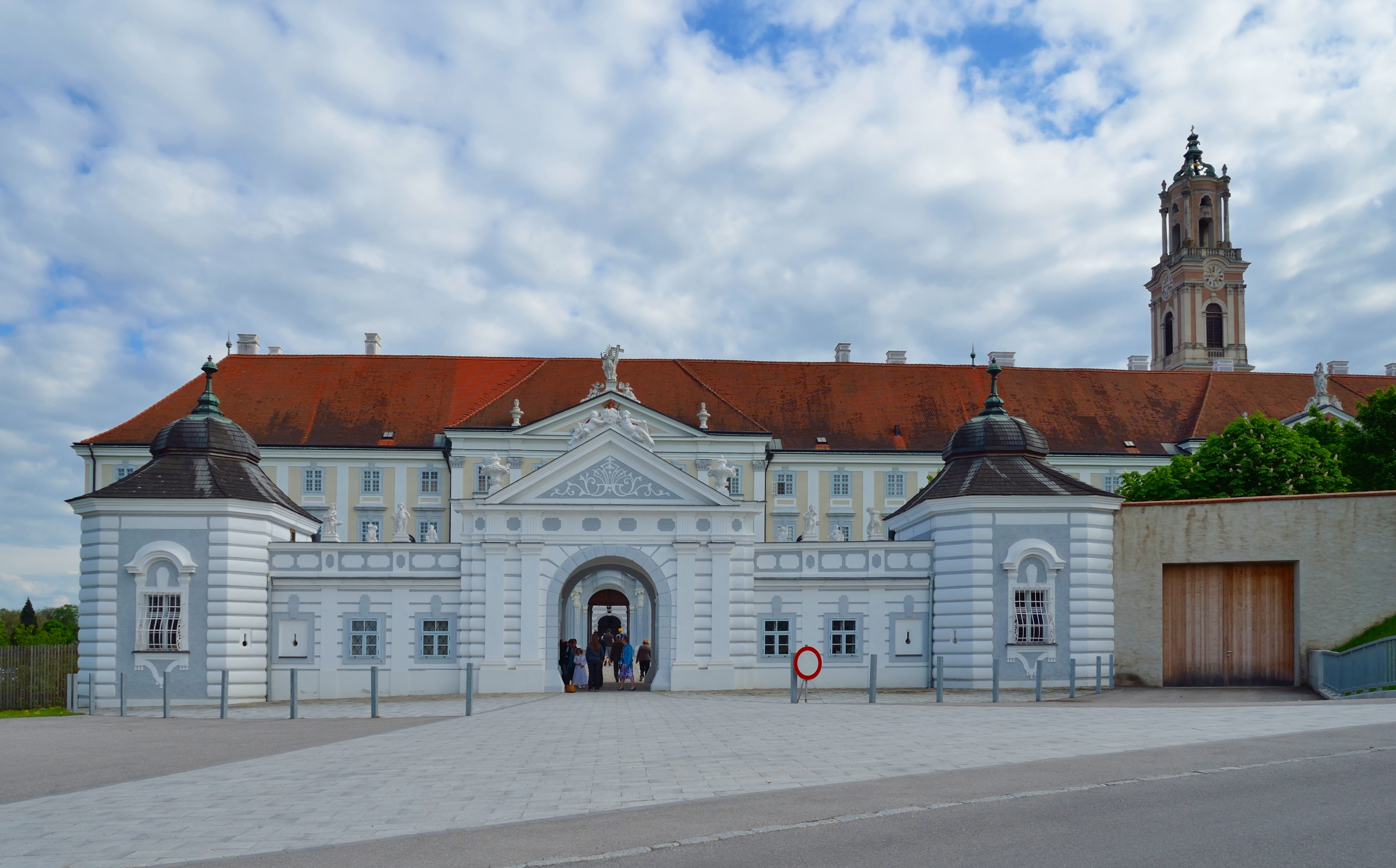
Herzogenburg Monastery

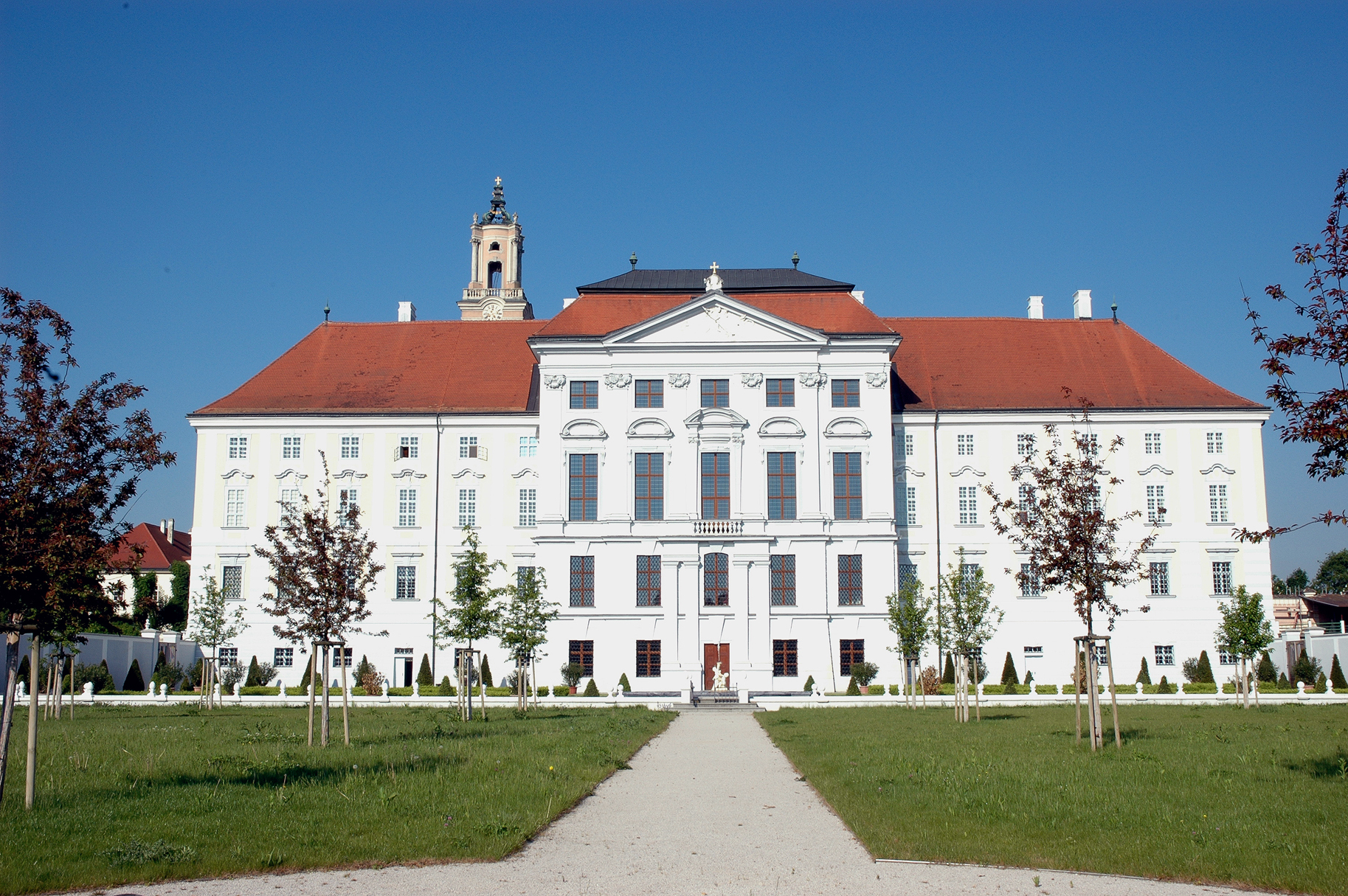
Herzogenburg Monastery

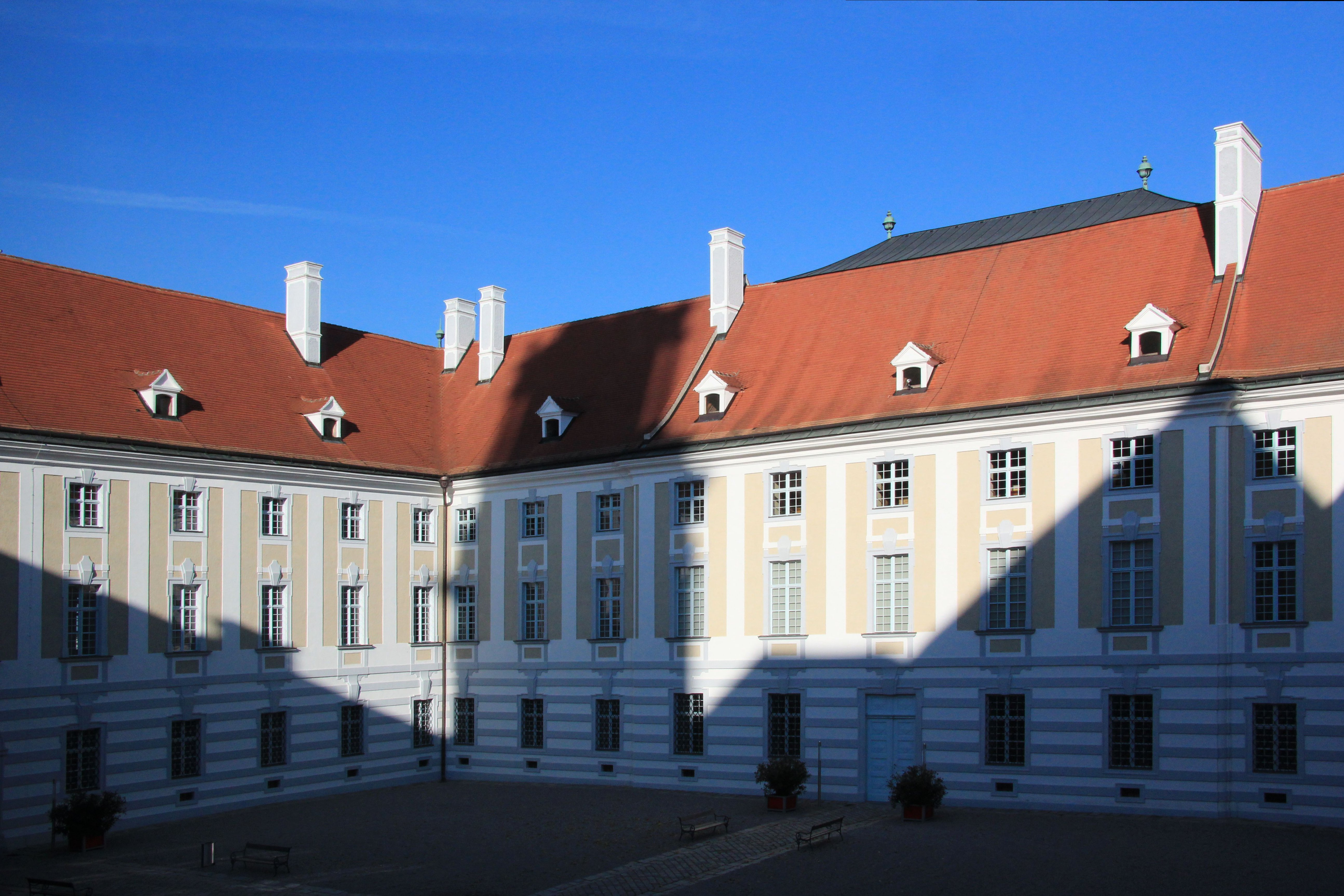
Herzogenburg Monastery inner courtyard

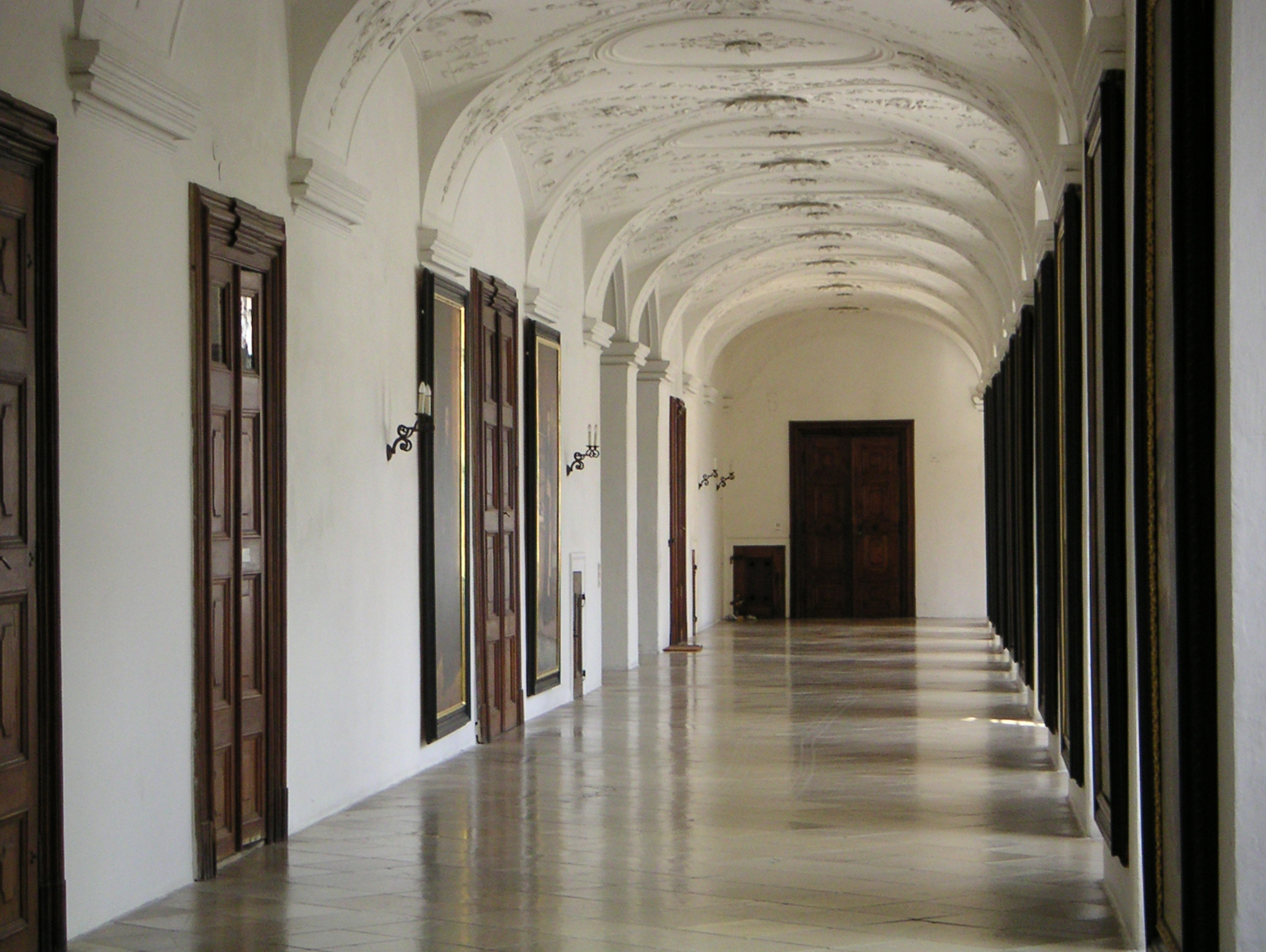
Cloister

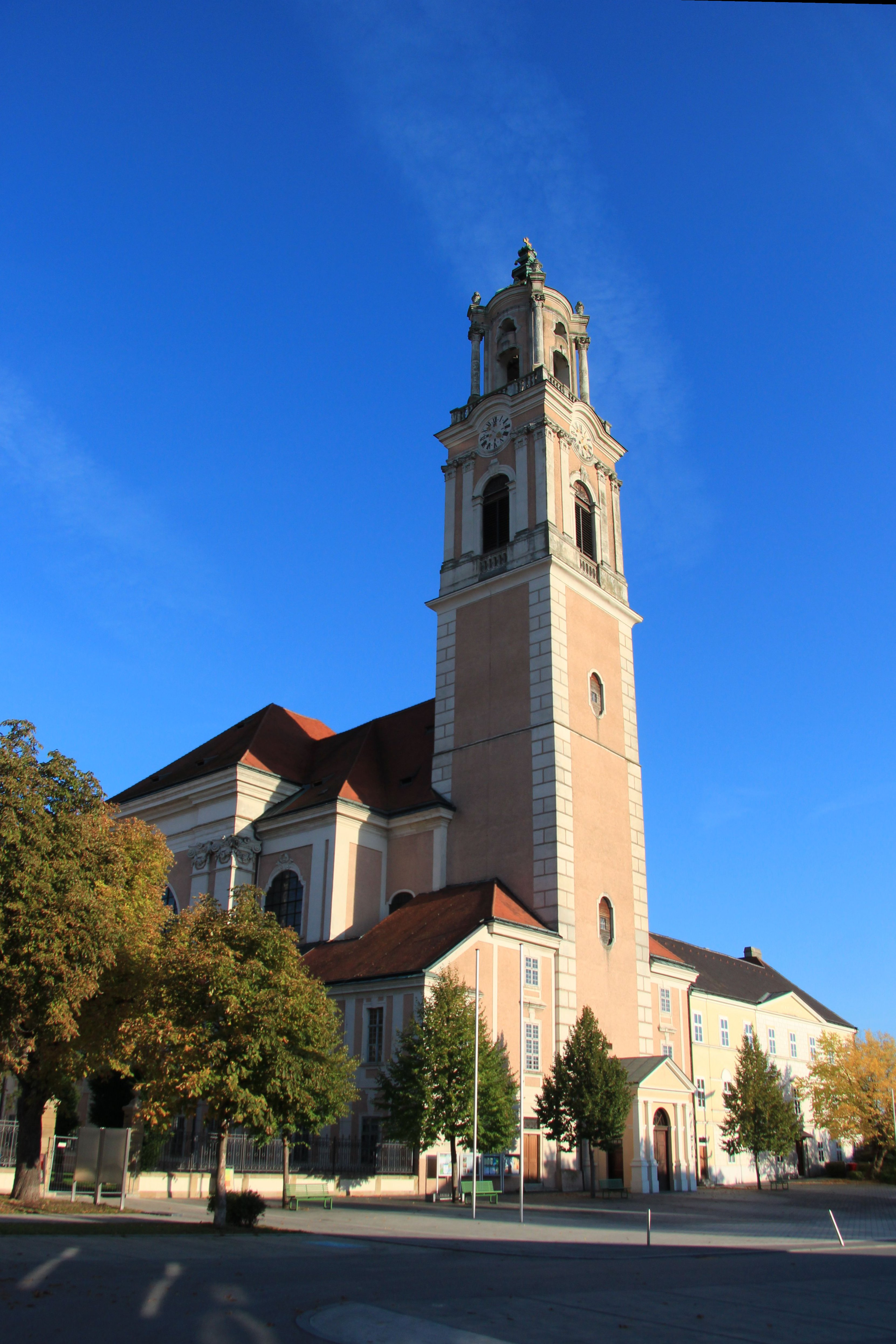
Herzogenburg Monastery Church tower

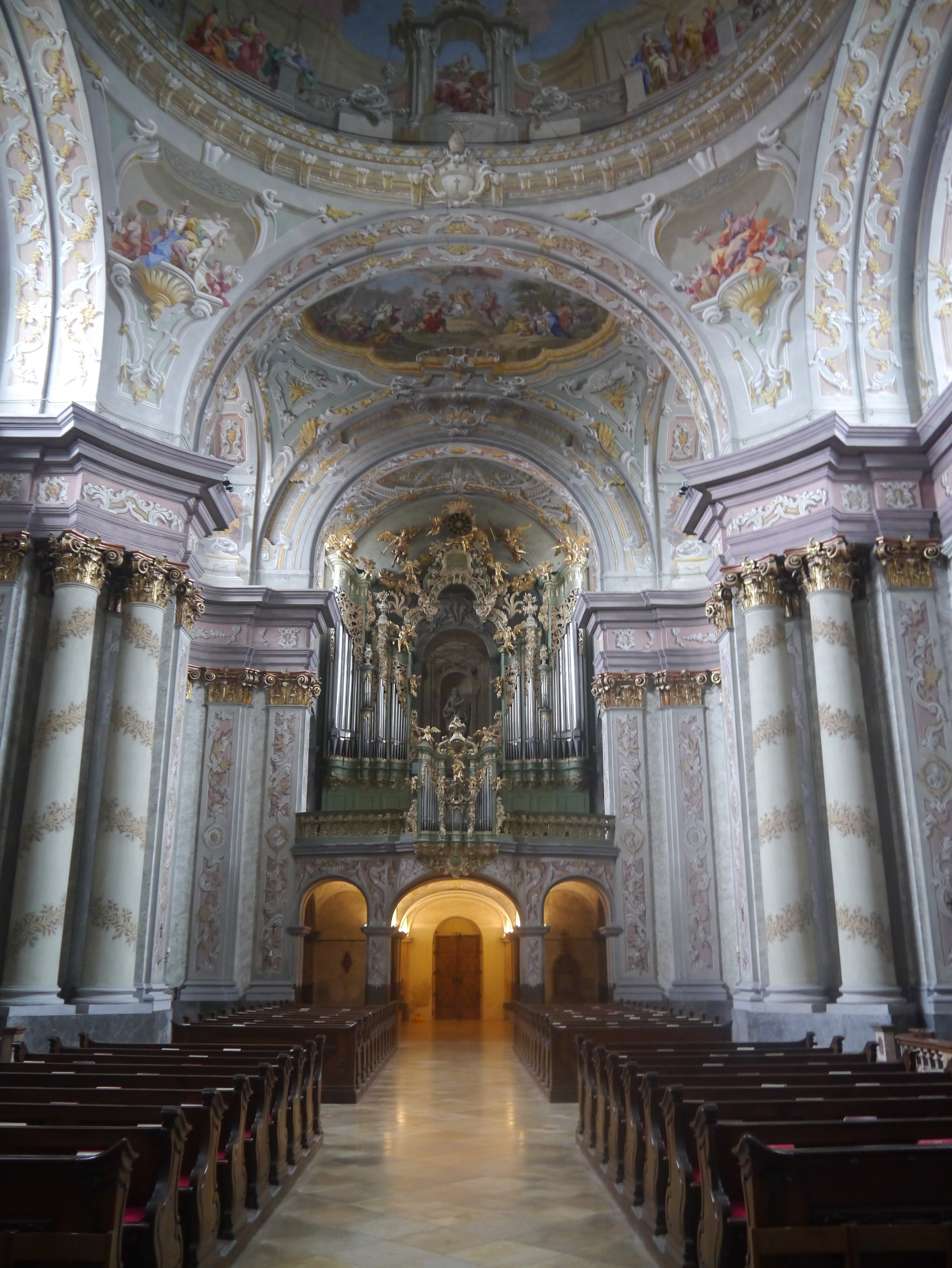
Herzogenburg Monastery Church interior

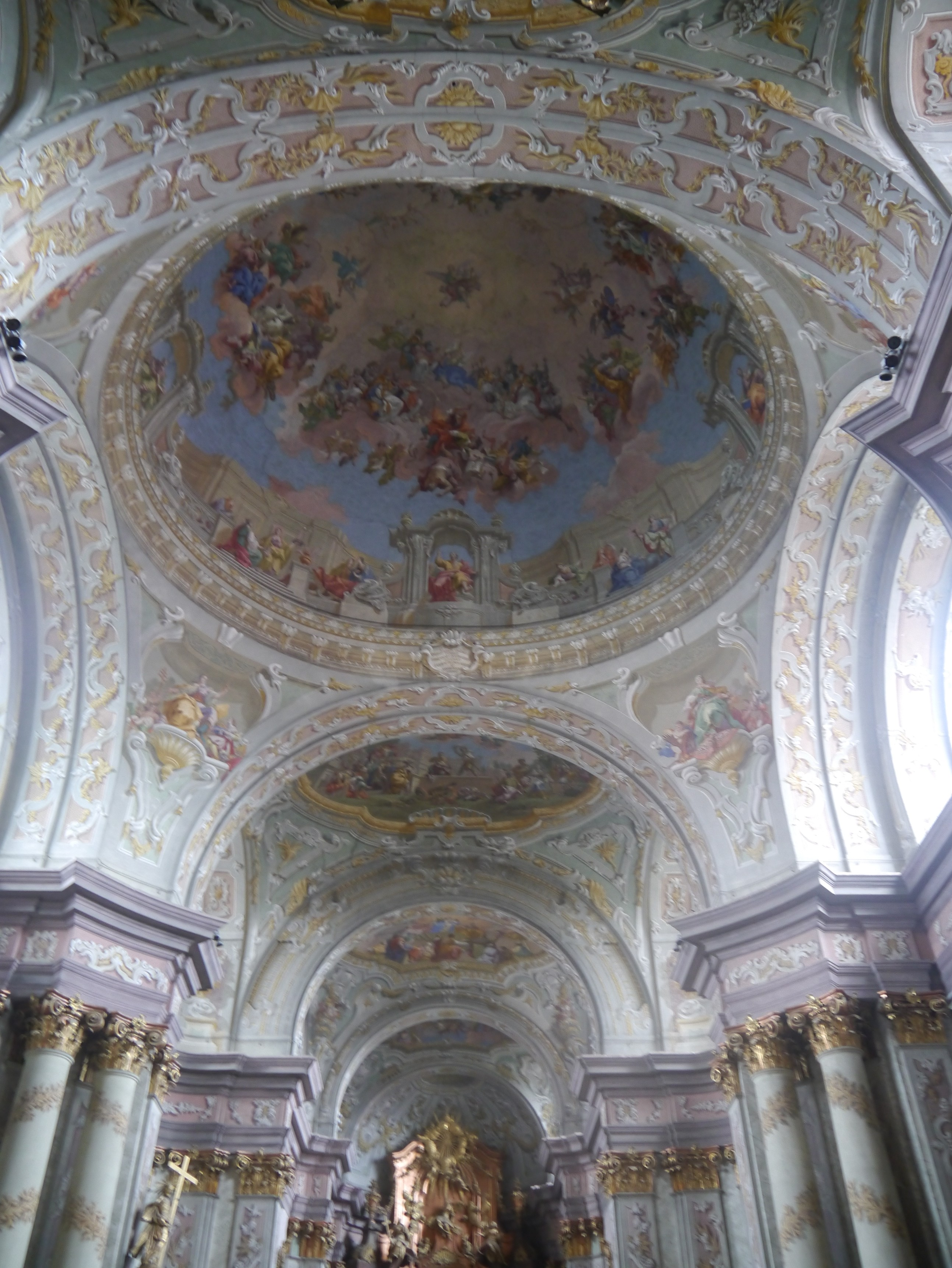
Herzogenburg Monastery Church ceiling

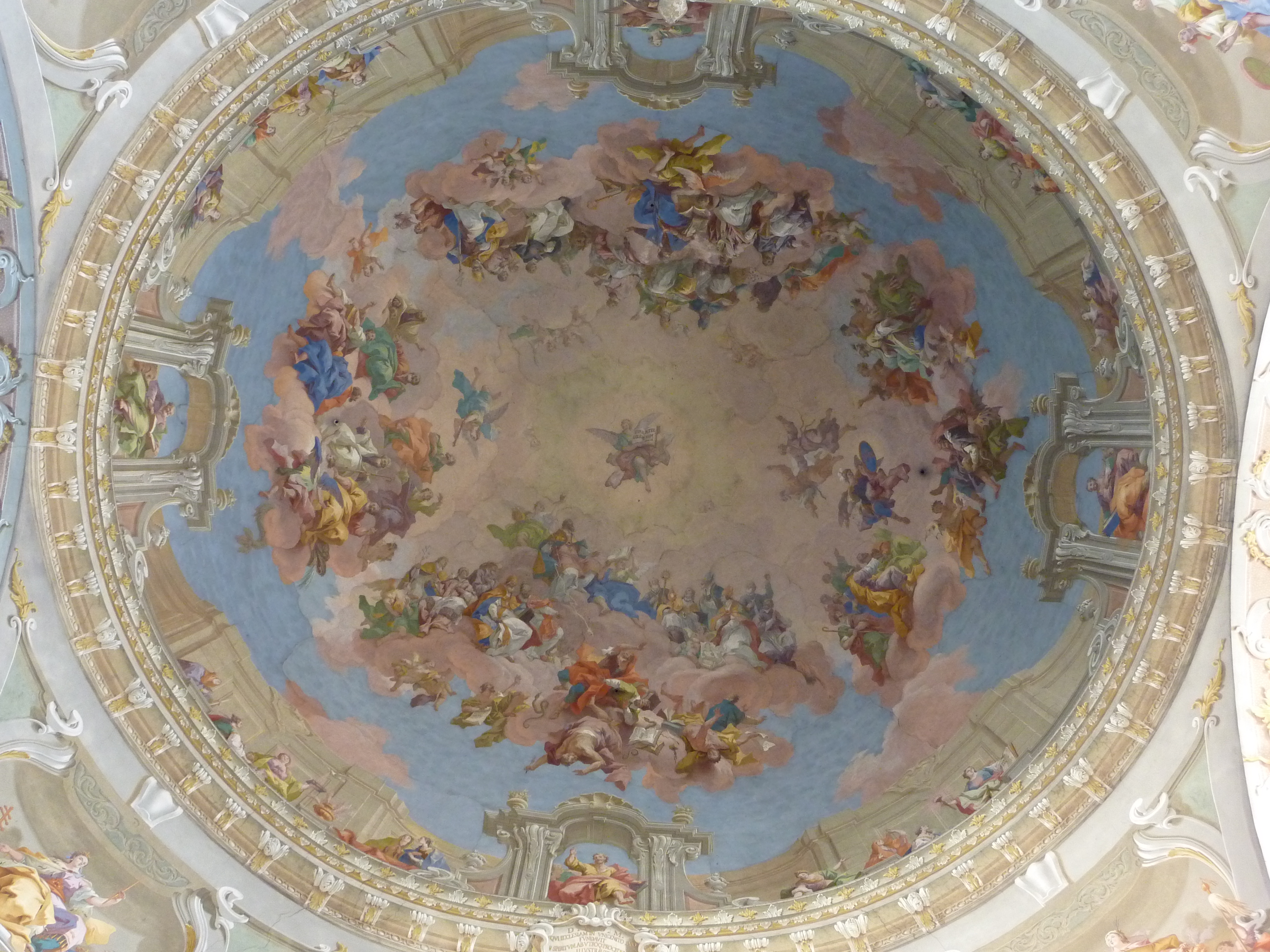
Herzogenburg Monastery Church ceiling frescoes

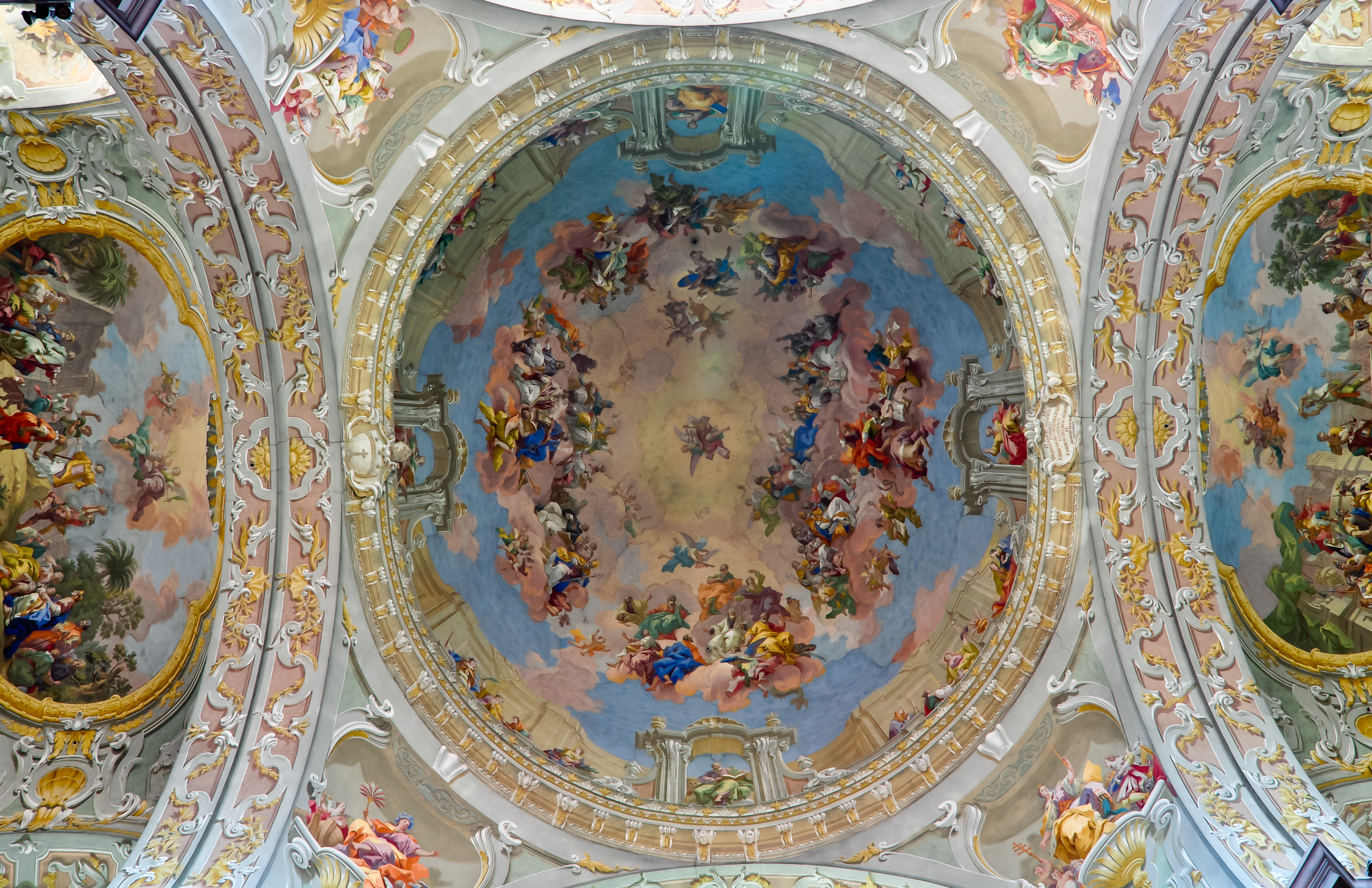
Herzogenburg Monastery Church ceiling frescoes

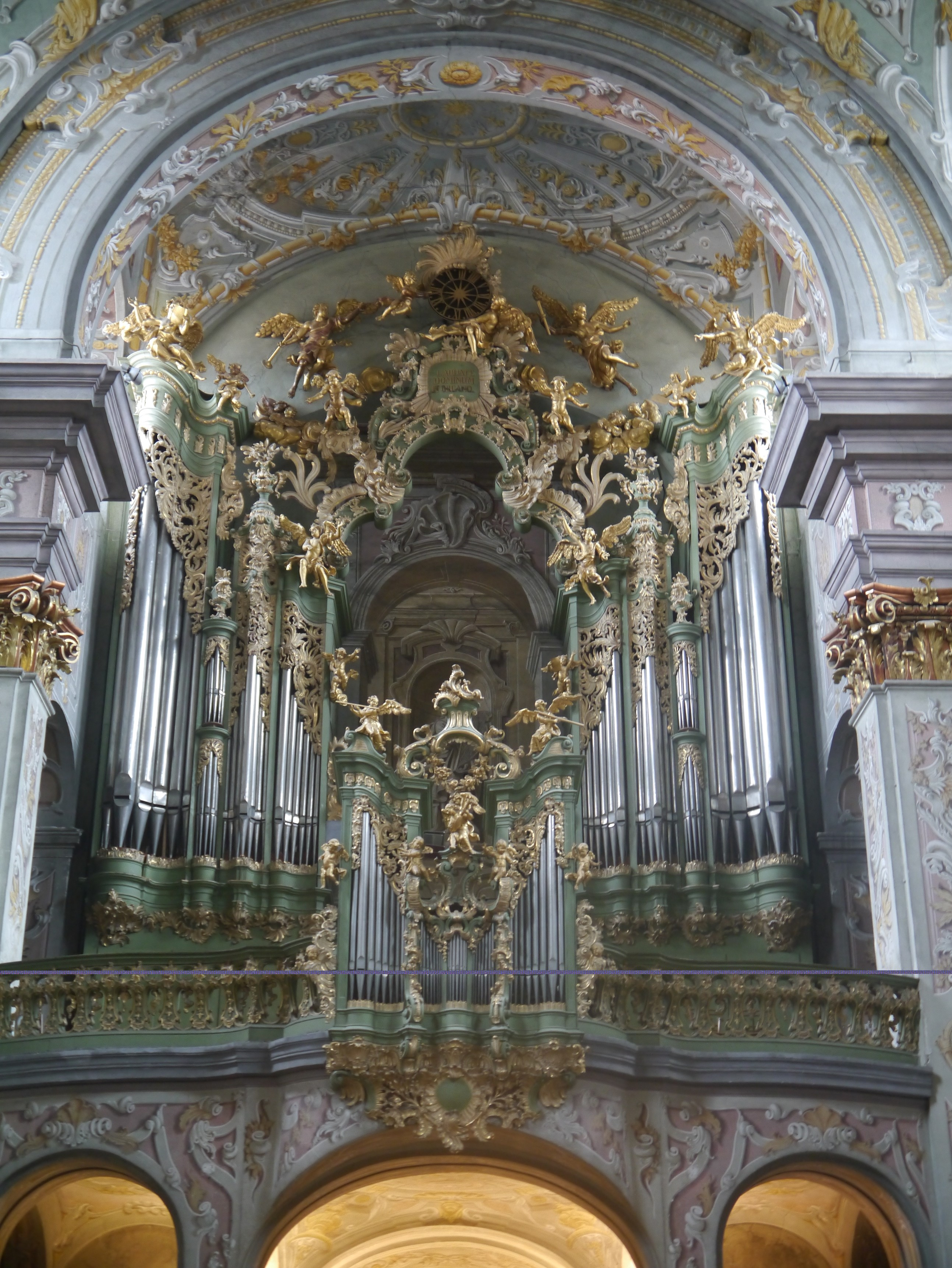
Organ

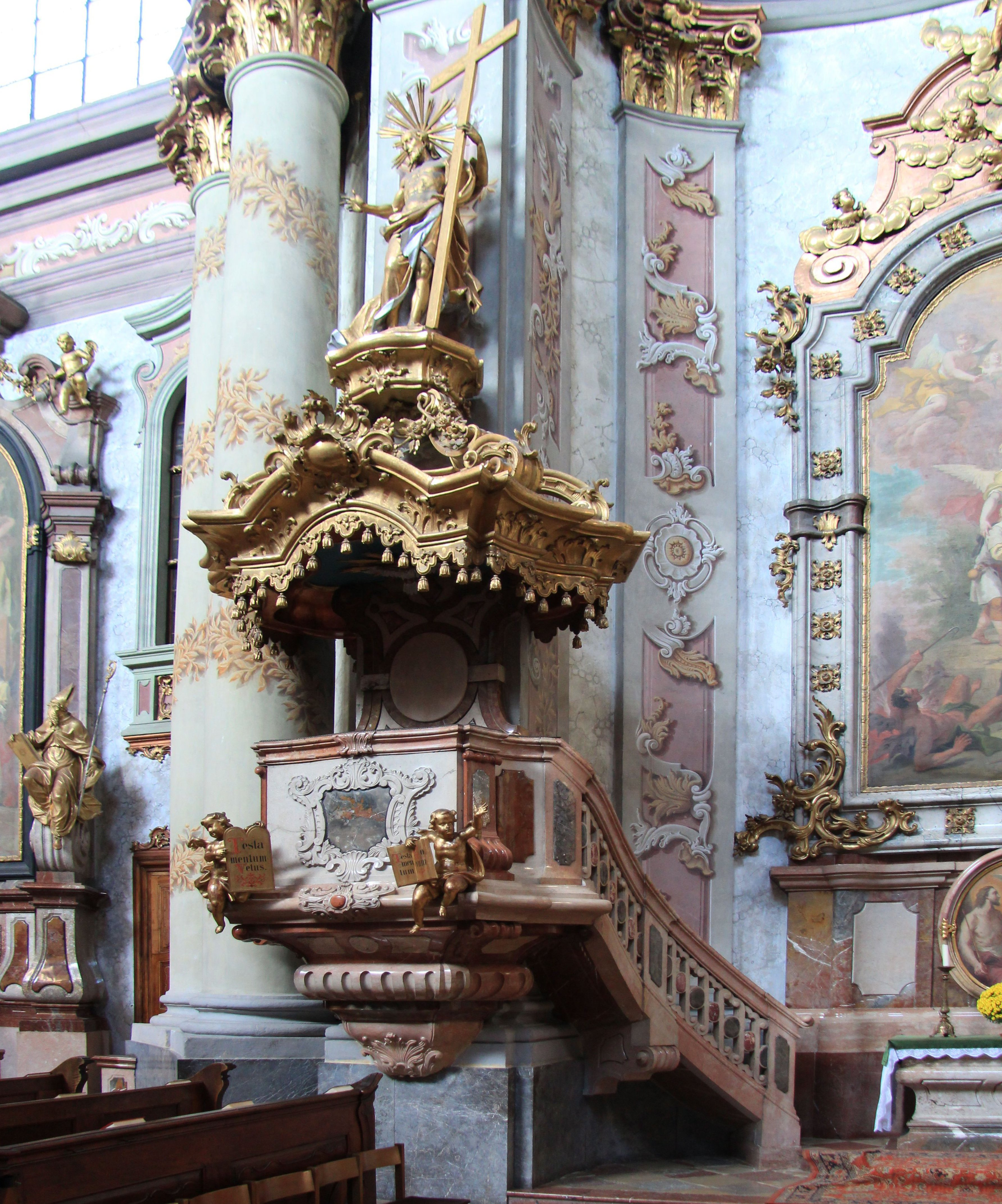
Pulpit

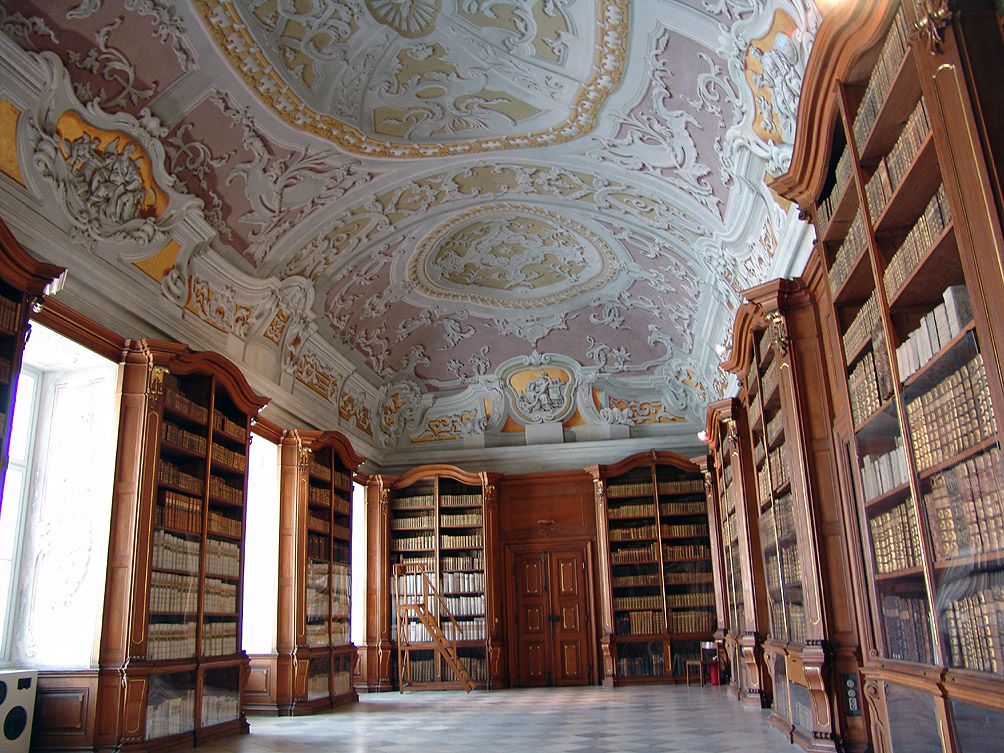
Library

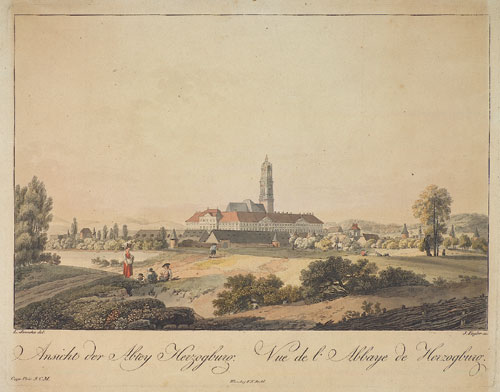
Herzogenburg Monastery, 1780

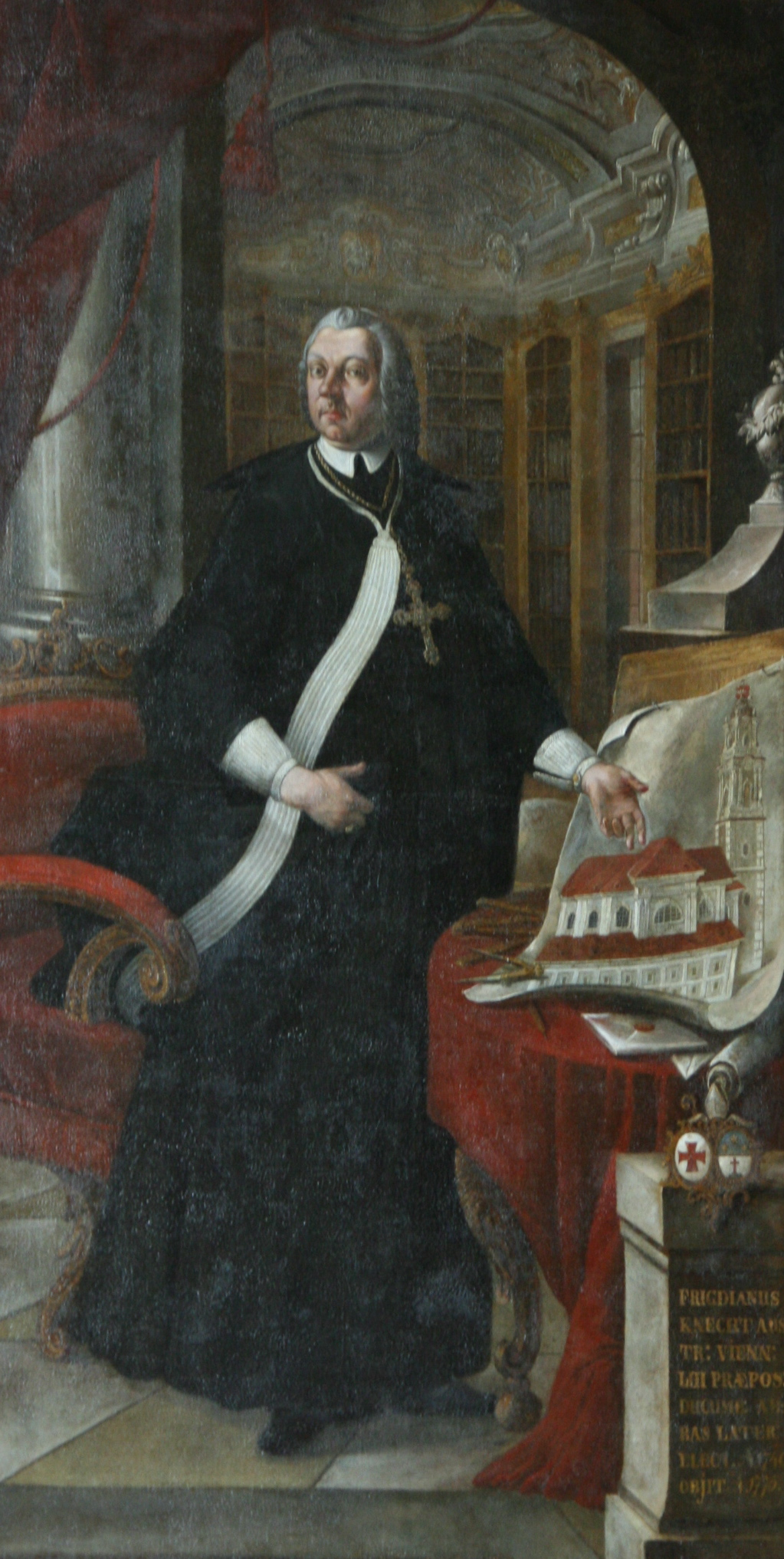
Provost Frigdian I. Knecht (1740–1775)

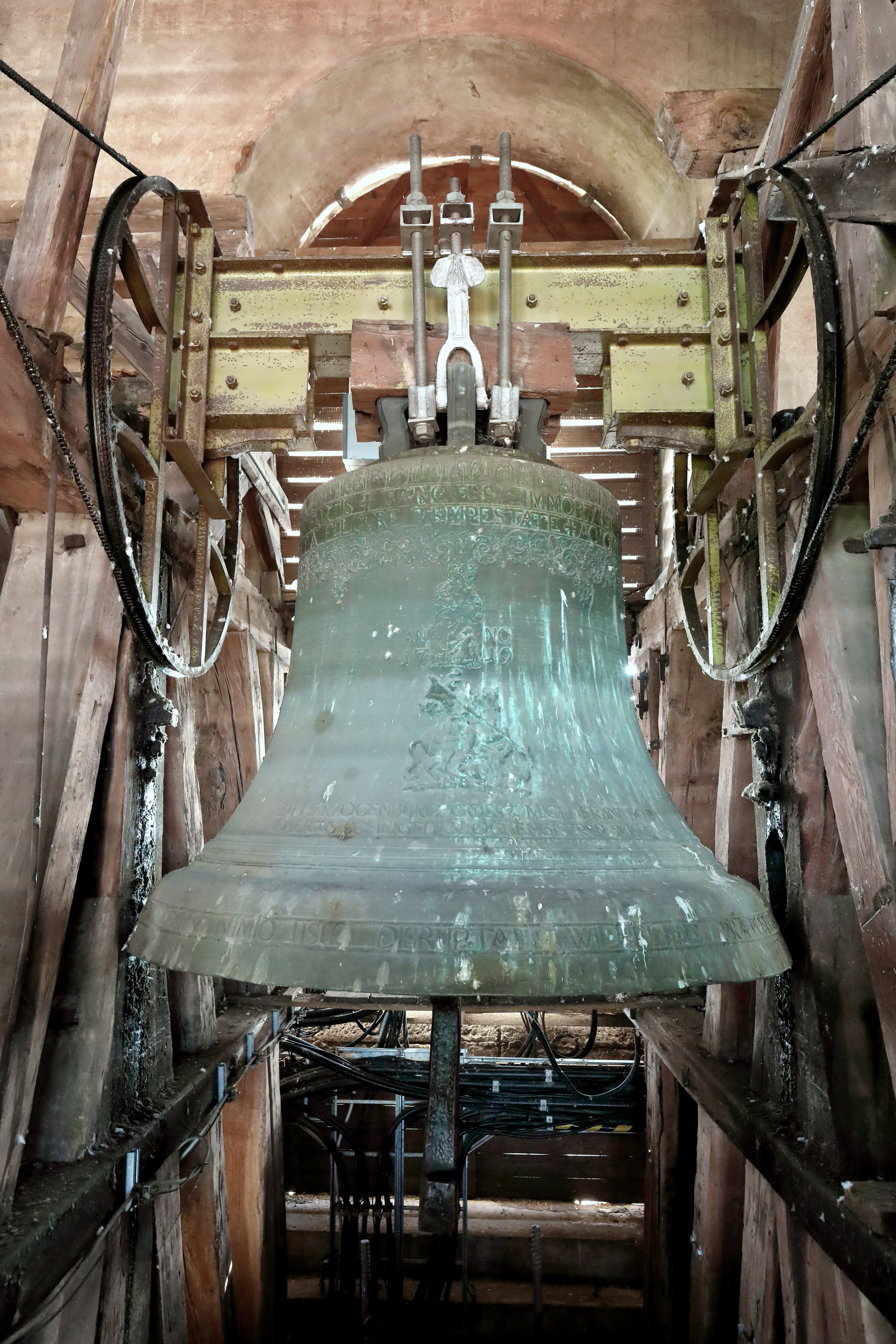
The bell „Pummerin“
