= Josef Munggenast =

Austrian architect and masterbuilder

Josef Munggenast (5 March 1680 – 3 May 1741) was an Austrian architect and masterbuilder of the Baroque period.

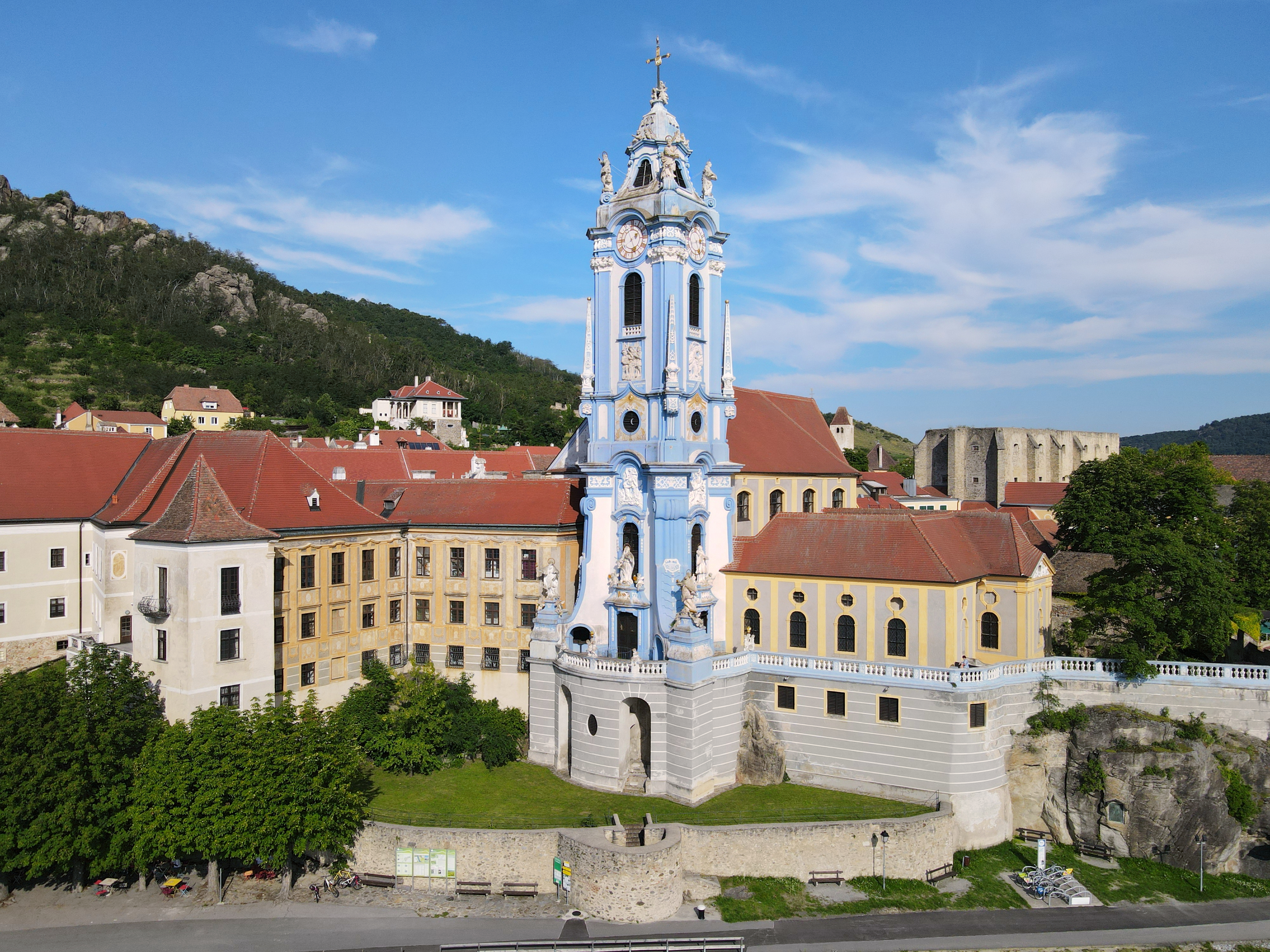
Dürnstein Abbey in the Wachau

Munggenast was born in Schnann in Tyrol, the nephew of Jakob Prandtauer, who advanced his career and whose influence marked his style for the whole of his life.

From 1717 Munggenast was master mason in Sankt Pölten. After Prandtauer's death in 1726 Munggenast continued the projects his uncle had in hand, principally at Melk Abbey, Herzogenburg Priory and the Pilgrimage Church of the Holy Trinity on the Sonntagberg near Seitenstetten Abbey, for which he was the masterbuilder from 1718.

Together with Matthias Steinl he built the towers at Zwettl Abbey and Dürnstein Abbey.

His main works are the Baroque refurbishments of Altenburg Abbey and Geras Abbey in the 1730s.

After his death in Sankt Pölten his business was carried on by his sons Franz Munggenast and Matthias Munggenast.

== External links/Sources ==
- Niederösterreichisches Landesmuseums Lexikon: entry for Josef Munggenast (in German)
