= Jakob Prandtauer =

Austrian architect

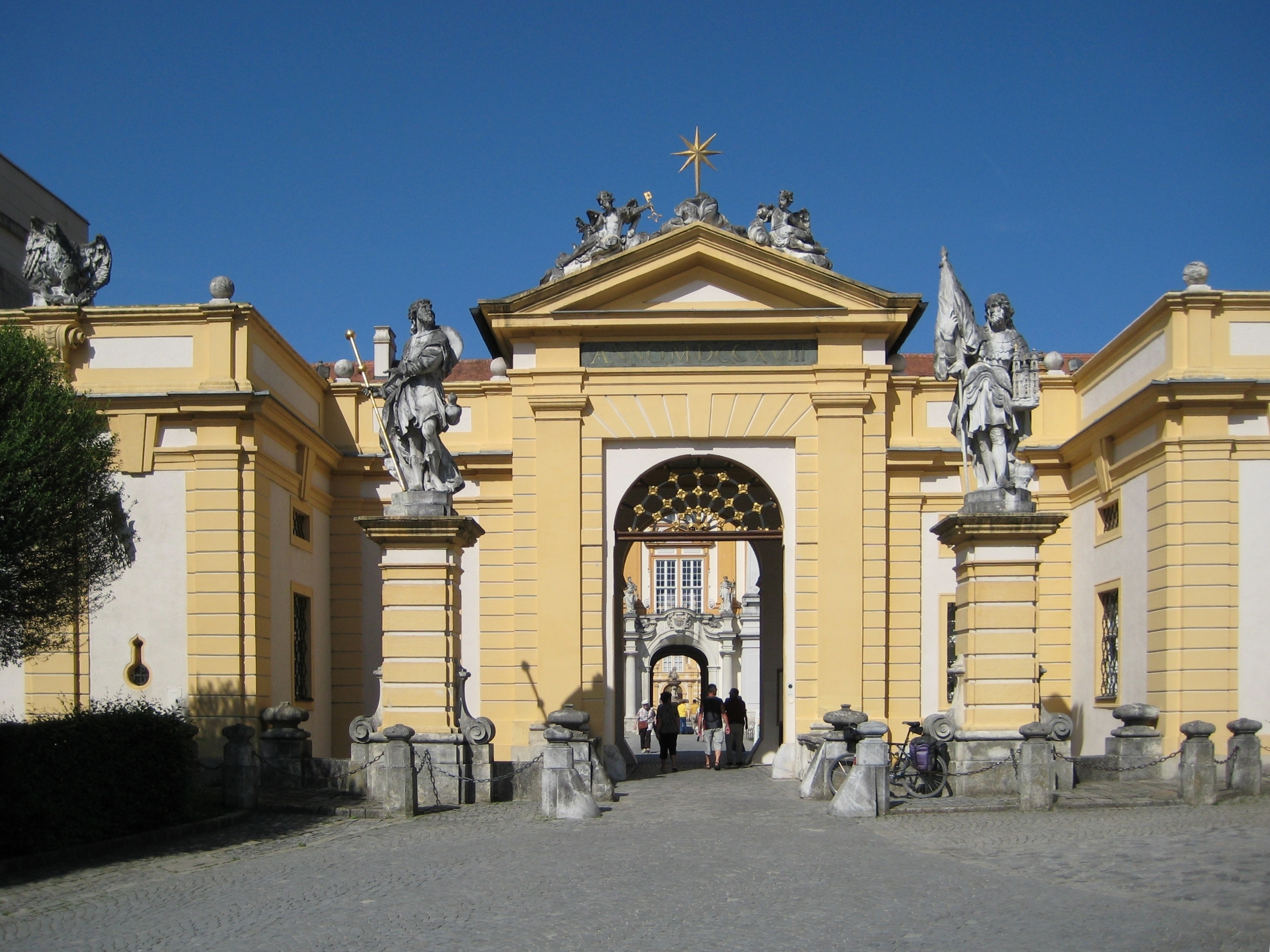
Main entrance of Melk Abbey

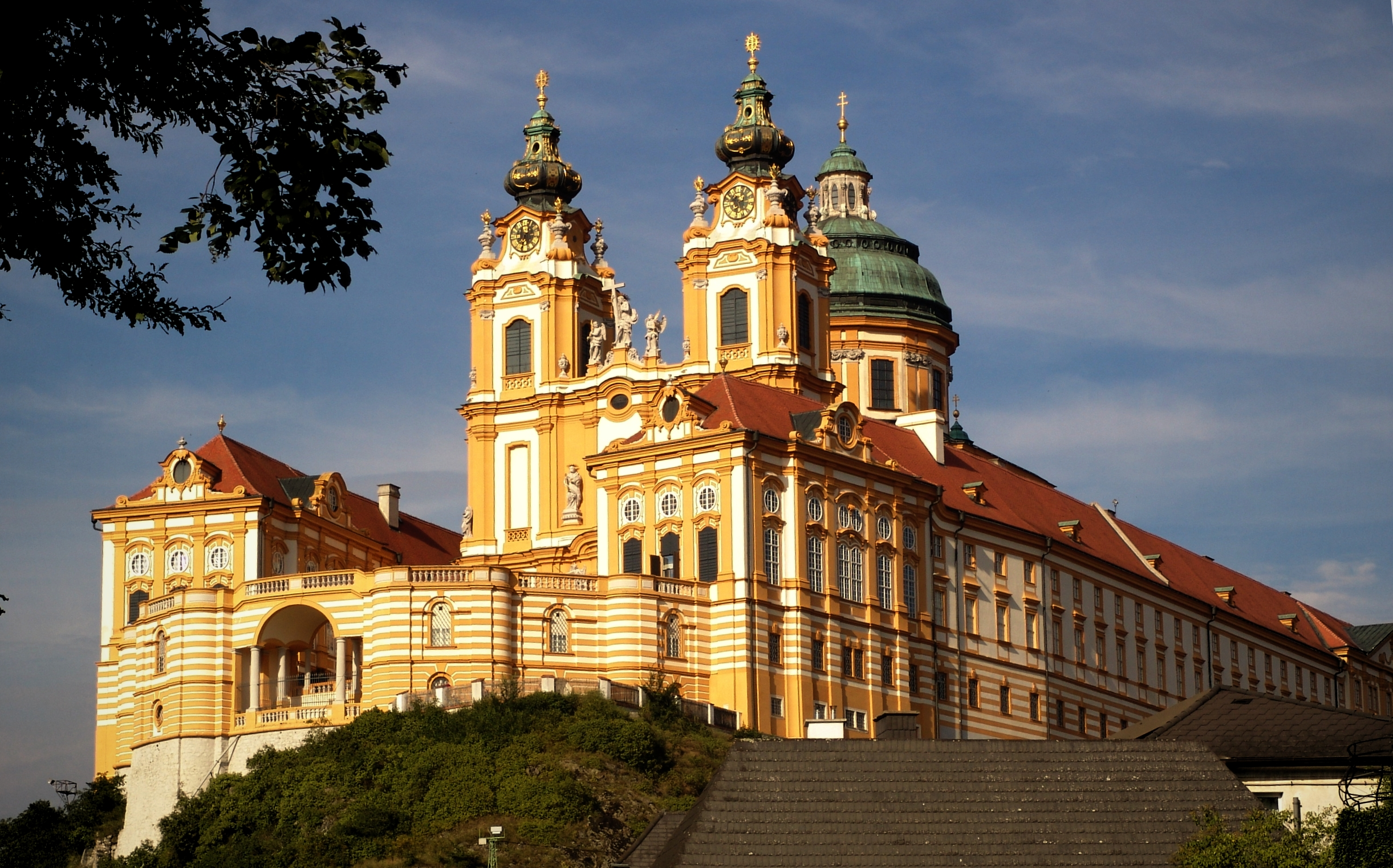
Melk Abbey Church

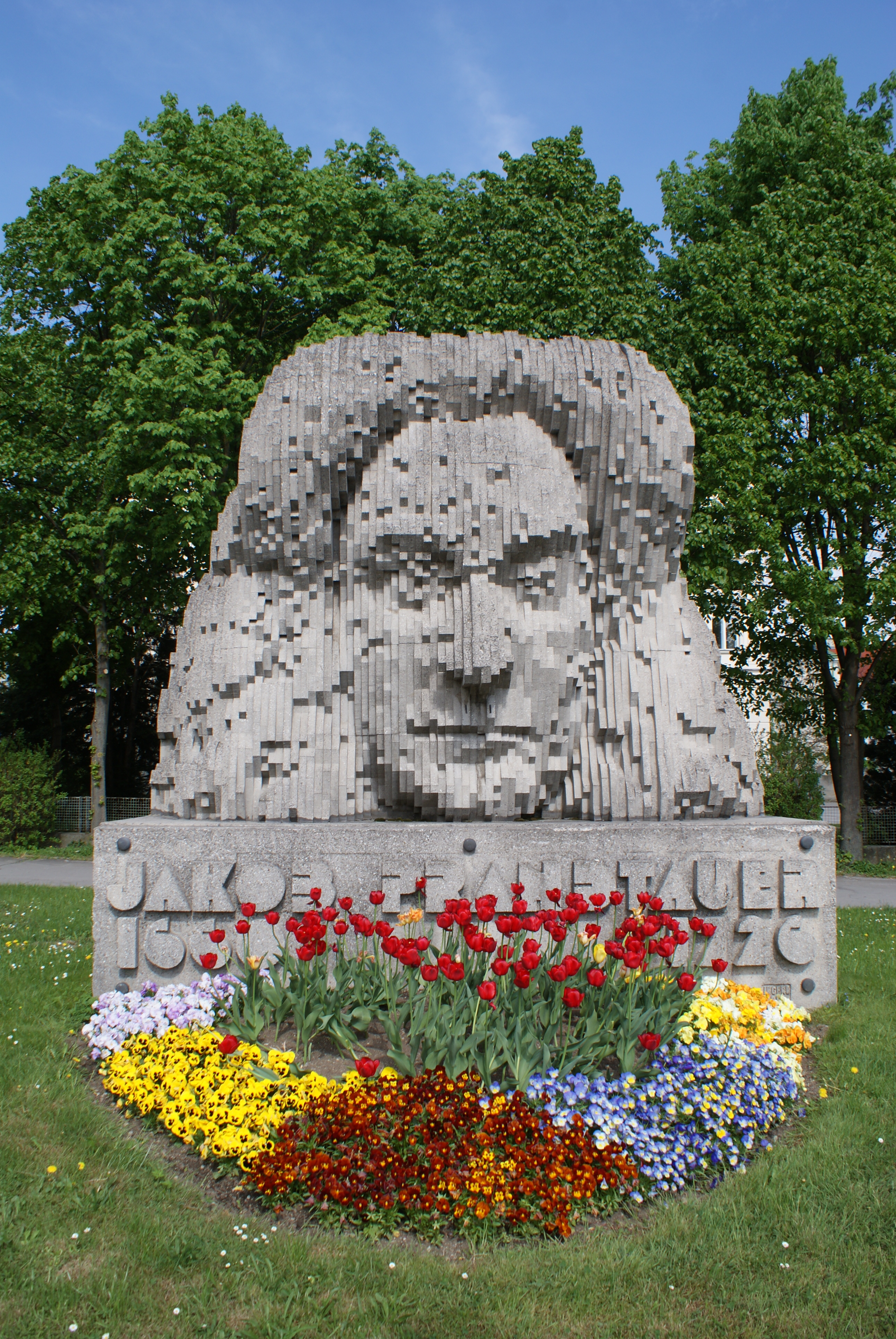
Jakob Prandtauer-monument in St. Pölten

Jakob Prandtauer (baptized in Stanz bei Landeck (Tyrol) on 16 July 1660; died in Sankt Pölten on 16 September 1726) was an Austrian Baroque architect.

== Career ==
Prandtauer was responsible for the baroque refurbishment of medieval abbeys in Austria. Trained as a stonemason rather than as an architect, he designed and supervised the construction of the church of Melk Abbey, in Melk, Lower Austria. He was the uncle of Josef Munggenast, who inherited his business and continued his style.
