= Greenberg =

Origin
- Origin: Yiddish
- Meaning: green hill
- Region of origin: Eastern Europe, Pale of Settlement

Greenberg is a surname common in North America and Anglosphere, with anglicized spelling of the German Grünberg (green mountain) or the Jewish Ashkenazi Yiddish Grinberg, an artificial surname.

Notable people with the surname Greenberg include:

== A–D ==
- Abraham Greenberg (1881–1941), New York politician
- Adam Greenberg (disambiguation), several people
- Aharon Greenberg, birth name of Aharon Megged (1920–2016), Israeli writer
- Aharon-Ya'akov Greenberg (1900–1963), Israeli politician
- Alan Greenberg (disambiguation), several people
- Albert Greenberg, American software engineer
- Allan Greenberg (born 1938), American new classical architect
- Andy Greenberg, American journalist
- Andrew Greenberg, American video game designer
- Andrew C. Greenberg (1957–2024), video game designer
- Ari Greenberg (born 1981), American bridge player
- Bernard Greenberg, American programmer and computer scientist
- Brad Greenberg (born 1954), American basketball coach, brother of Seth Greenberg
- Bryan Greenberg (born 1978), American actor
- Brooke Greenberg (1993–2013), American with "Syndrome X" condition
- Brooke Greenberg, better known as Brooke Alexx, American singer-songwriter
- Carl Greenberg (1908–1984), American journalist
- Charles Greenberg (born 1953) American composer
- Clement Greenberg (1909–1994), American art critic
- Craig Greenberg (born 1973), American politician
- Dan Greenberg (born 1965), American lawyer and politician
- Daniel Greenberg (educator) (1934–2021), American columnist and educator
- Daniel Greenberg (game designer), role-playing and video game designer
- Daniel S. Greenberg (1931–2020), American journalist, editor and author
- David Aaron Greenberg (born 1971), American poet, songwriter, artist and art critic
- David Greenberg (historian), American historian

== E–L ==
- Eliezer Greenberg (1896–1977), American Yiddish poet
- Elinor Miller Greenberg (1932–2021), American adult education pioneer
- Ellen Rae Greenberg (1983–2011), American teacher, died either of suicide or homicide
- Evan G. Greenberg (born 1955), American business executive
- Everett Peter Greenberg (born 1948), American microbiologist
- Gail Greenberg (born 1938), American bridge player
- Gerald B. Greenberg (1936–2017), American film editor
- Gary Greenberg, American TV writer, author and comedian
- Hank Greenberg (1911–1986), American Hall of Fame baseball player
- Harold Greenberg (1930–1996), Canadian film producer
- Hayim Greenberg (1889–1953), American philosopher of Judaism
- Ivan Greenberg (1896–1966), English journalist
- Irving Greenberg (born 1933), American Modern Orthodox rabbi and author
- Jack Greenberg (1924–2016), American attorney and legal scholar
- Jack M. Greenberg (born 1942), American executive at McDonald's
- Jay Greenberg (composer) (born 1991), American composer and cellist
- Jay Greenberg (psychoanalyst) (born 1942), American psychoanalyst and psychologist
- Jeffrey W. Greenberg (born 1951), American lawyer and business executive
- J. Mayo Greenberg (1922-2001), American astrophysicist
- Jill Greenberg (born 1967), American photographer
- Joanna Greenberg (born 1950), British judge
- Joanne Greenberg (born 1932), American writer
- Johann.N.Greenberg (born 2000), engineer
- Joseph Greenberg (1915–2001), American linguist
- Joshua Greenberg (born 1976), American academic
- L. J. Greenberg (1861–1931), British Jewish journalist

== M–R ==
- Martin Greenberg (publisher) (1918–2013), American science fiction anthologist and publisher
- Martin Greenberg (poet) (1918–2021), American poet and translator
- Martin H. Greenberg (1941–2011), American speculative fiction anthologist
- Maurice R. Greenberg (born 1925), American business executive
- Michael Greenberg (economist) (1914–1992), British economic historian
- Michael Greenberg (lawyer), American lawyer
- Michael Greenberg (writer) (born 1952), American writer
- Mike Greenberg (born 1967), American television and radio host
- Morton Ira Greenberg (1933–2021), United States Circuit Court judge
- Moshe Greenberg (1928–2010), American rabbi and Biblical scholar
- Noah Greenberg, (1919–1966), American choral conductor
- Oscar W. Greenberg (born 1932), American physicist
- Ralph Greenberg (born 1944), American mathematician
- Richard Greenberg (1958–2025), American playwright and television writer
- Richard Greenberg (water polo) (1902–1978), American water polo player
- Richard Alan Greenberg (1947–2018), American designer of special effects
- Robert Greenberg (born 1954), American composer, pianist, and musicologist
- Roman Greenberg (born 1982), Israeli heavyweight boxer

== S–Z ==
- Samuel Greenberg (1893–1917), American poet
- Samuel L. Greenberg (1898–1992), New York state senator
- Sanford Greenberg (born 1940), American philanthropist most well known for his efforts toward the goal of ending blindness
- Seth Greenberg (born 1956), American coach of the Virginia Tech Hokies basketball team, brother of Brad Greenberg
- Seymour Greenberg (1920–2006), American tennis player
- Shawn Greenberg, Manitoba judge
- Shmuel Greenberg (born 1975), mayor of Beit Shemesh, Israel
- Stan Greenberg (born 1945), American political strategist
- Steve Greenberg (record producer), American noted for "discovering" popular musical acts such as Hanson, Baha Men and Joss Stone
- Steven Greenberg (musician) (born 1950), American musician best known for writing the 1980 hit song "Funkytown", performed by Lipps Inc.
- Steven Greenberg (rabbi) (born 1956), American rabbi, educator and author

== See also ==
- Greenberg (film), 2010 film
- Greenburg (disambiguation)
- Grünberg (disambiguation) (also Grunbergg)
- Grinberg
- Grynberg
