= Grünberg =

Grünberg or Gruenberg (German for green mountain) may refer to:

== Places ==
- Grünberg, Hesse, a town in Hesse
- Grünberg (St. Bernhard-Frauenhofen), a part of Sankt Bernhard-Frauenhofen, Austria
- Grünberg, the German name for Zielona Góra, Poland
- Grünberg, a part of Leopoldshagen, Mecklenburg, Western Pomerania
- Grünberg, a part of Ottendorf-Okrilla, Saxony
- Gruenberg, South Australia is now part of Moculta, east of the Barossa Valley

== Other uses ==
- Grünberg (surname)
- Grünberg aerial tramway, in Gmunden, Austria

== See also ==
- Greenberg
- Grinberg, Grynberg
- Grünburg
