= Haselberg =

Haselberg may refer to:

== Places ==
- Haselberg (Wriezen), a district of Wriezen, Brandenburg
- Haselberg (Königsbrück) (also Wettinhöhe) Königsbrück, Saxony
- Haselberg (Irnfritz-Messern), Katastralgemeinde in Irnfritz-Messern, Lower Austria
- Haselberg (Bad Traunstein), a Katastralgemeinde in Bad Traunstein, Lower Austria
- A German name (1938 - 1945) of Krasnoznamensk, Kaliningrad Oblast

== Family name ==
- Haselberg family
- Martin Rochus Sebastian von Haselberg (born 1949), American artist
- Sophie von Haselberg, American actress and producer

== See also ==
- Hasselberg (disambiguation)
