= Geras Abbey =

Premonstratensian abbey in Lower Austria

Coordinates: 48°47′51″N 15°40′24″E

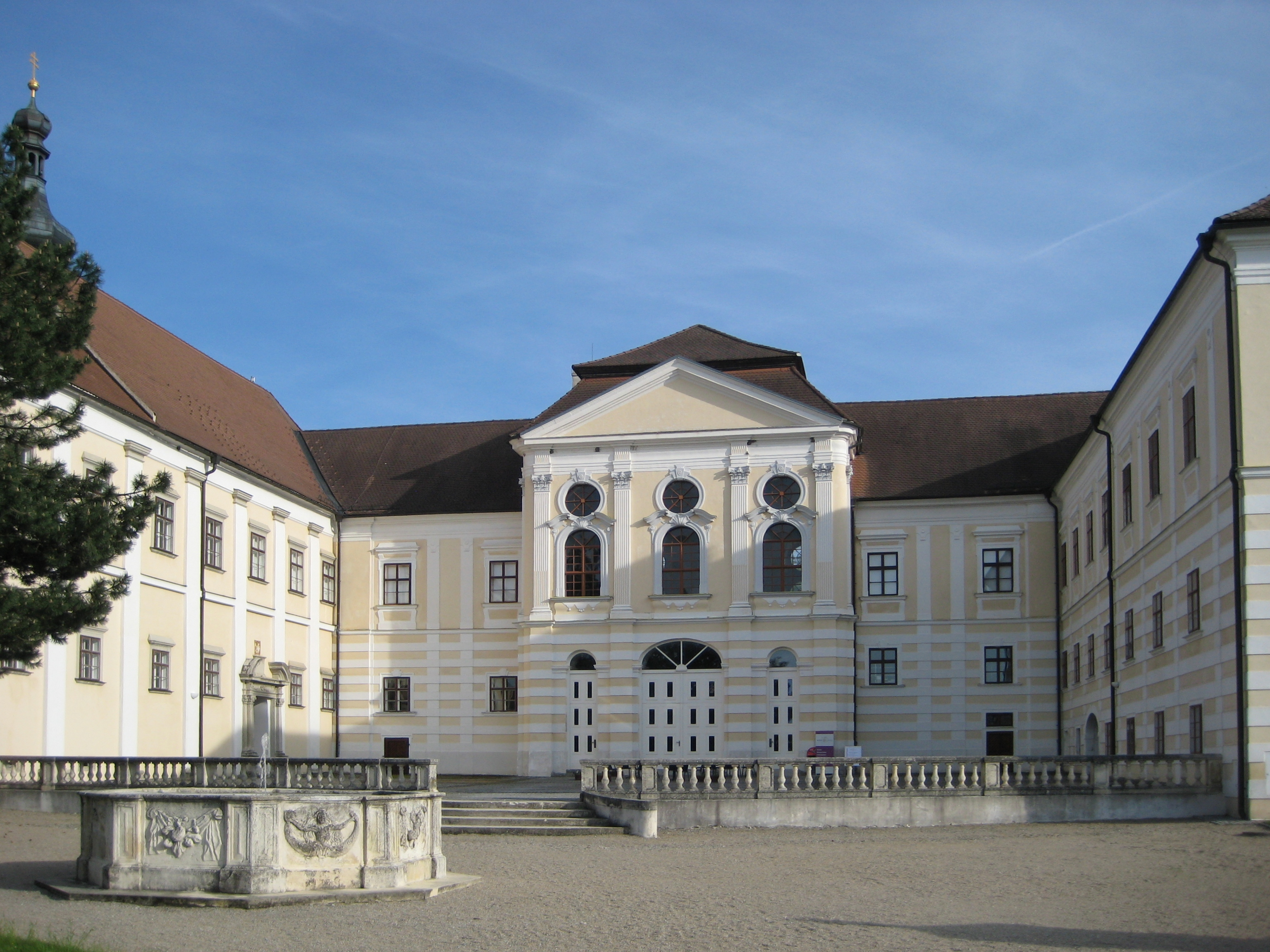
Abbey courtyard

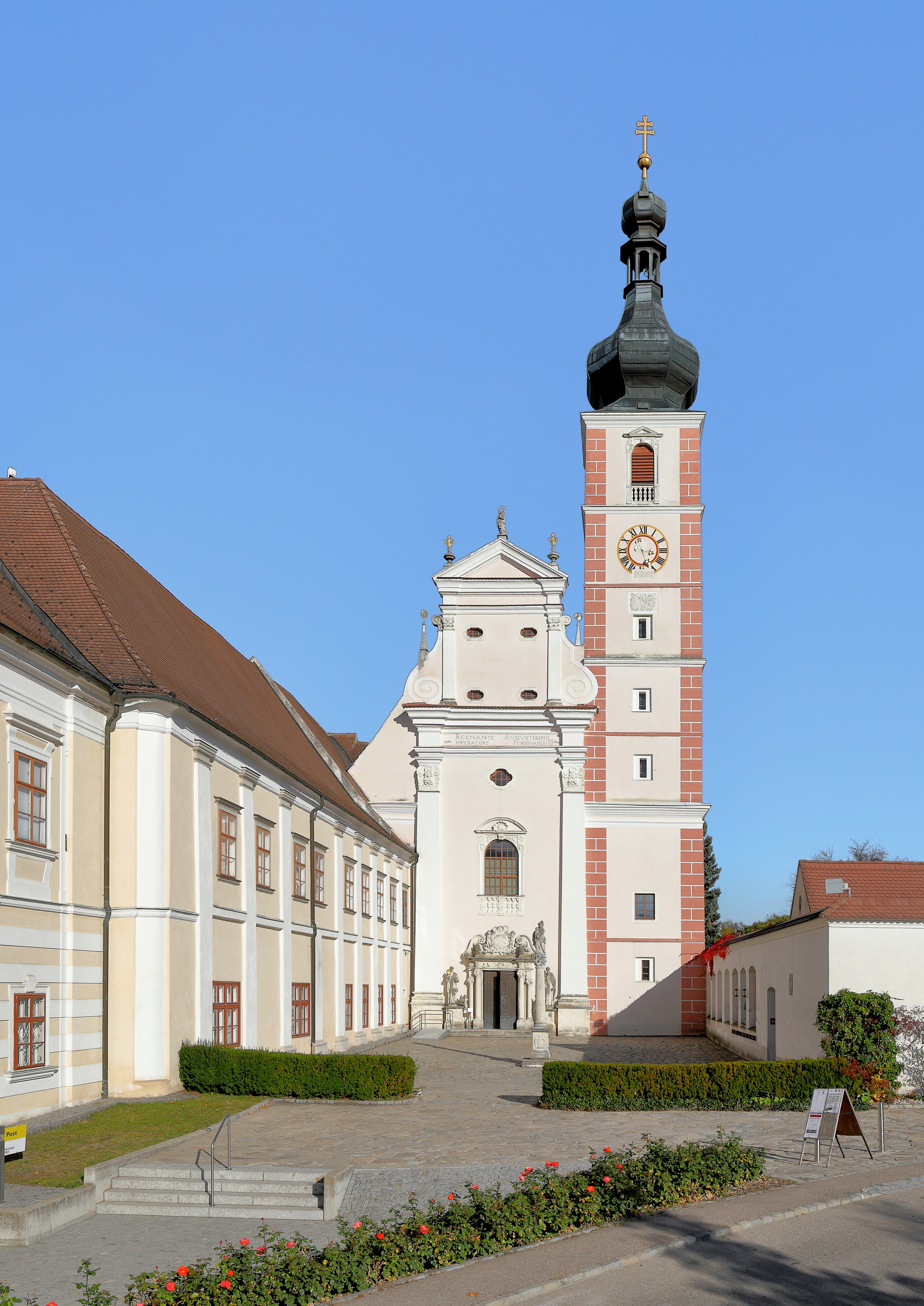
Abbey church

Geras Abbey (Stift Geras) is a Premonstratensian monastery in Geras in Lower Austria. Since 1783, it has also owned the premises of the former Pernegg Abbey nearby.

== History ==
The abbey was founded in 1153 as a daughter house of Seelau Abbey by Ekbert and Ulrich of Pernegg and settled by canons from Seelau. Geras Abbey was able to survive the reforms of Emperor Joseph II and the consequent monastery closures of 1783, and remains in operation to this day.

The abbey church is a Romanesque basilica which was reworked in the Baroque style in the 18th century by the architect Josef Munggenast and the fresco painter Paul Troger.

In 1953, the church was elevated to the status of a minor basilica.

Today, the abbey is often used as a venue for classical music recitals.

== Pernegg Abbey ==
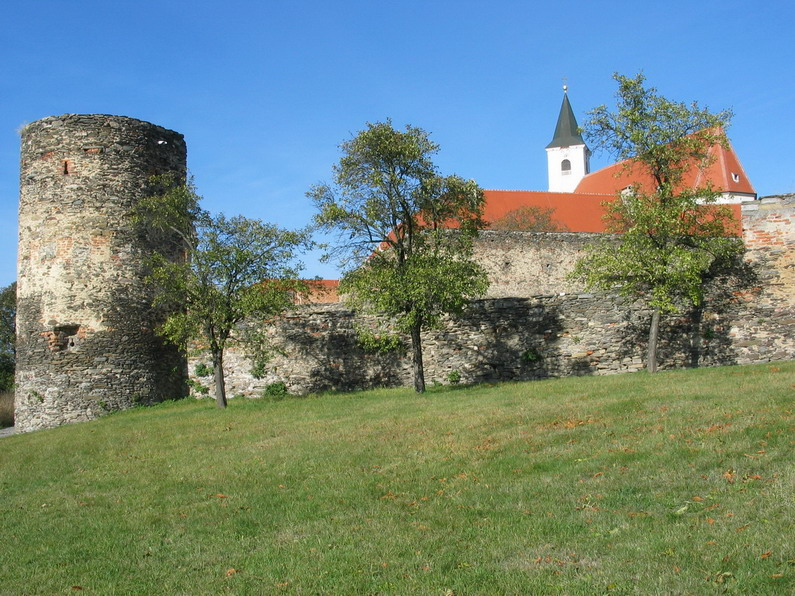
Pernegg Abbey

In Pernegg, about 10 kilometres from Geras, Ekbert and Ulrich of Pernegg, the founders of Geras Abbey, also founded Pernegg Abbey, a Premonstratensian nunnery which was also a daughter house of Seelau Abbey.

Pernegg became a community of canons in 1584. In 1700, it became an abbey but was dissolved in 1783 under the reforms of Emperor Joseph II. In the mid-19th century, the premises were acquired by Geras Abbey. Since 1995, they have been used as a retreat and seminar centre for the monastery at Geras.
