= David Greenberg =

David Greenberg could refer to:

- David Aaron Greenberg (born 1971), American poet, songwriter, artist and art critic
- David Michael Greenberg, American psychologist and musician
- David Greenberg (historian), American historian
- David F. Greenberg, American criminologist
