= Grinberg =

Grinberg is a surname, a Yiddish variant of Grünberg, literally "green mountain" in German. Notable people with the surname include:

- Adam Grinberg, birth name of Adam Greenberg (cinematographer) (1939–2025), Polish cinematographer
- Alexander Grinberg (1885–1979), Soviet photographer
- Anouk Grinberg (born 1963), Belgian actor
- Emanuel Grinberg (1911–1982), Latvian mathematician
- Gedalio Grinberg (1931–2009), Cuban-American watchmaker
- Iosif Grinberg (1906–1980), Soviet literary critic
- Ivan Grinberg (1908–1973), birth name of Philip Rahv
- Jacobo Grinberg (born 1946), Mexican neurophysiologist and psychologist
- Jacques Grinberg (1941-2011), neo-expressionist painter and printmaker
- Linda Grinberg (1951–2002), American HIV/AIDS activist
- Louise Grinberg (born 1993), French actress
- Maria Grinberg (1908–1978), Soviet pianist
- Miguel Grinberg (1937–2022), Argentine writer, poet, and journalist
- Ricardo Grinberg (born 1948), Argentine chess master
- Sara Topelson de Grinberg (born 1945), Polish-born Mexican architect
- Suzanne Grinberg (1888–1972), French lawyer, feminist and pacifist
- Svetlana Grinberg (born 1944), Soviet table tennis player
- Uri Zvi Grinberg (1896–1981), Israeli poet, journalist and politician
- Yoysef Grinberg (1900–1996), Polish-born American actor
- Zalman Grinberg (1912–1983), American physician

== See also ==
- Grīnbergs, Latvianized variant
- Greenberg
- Grimberg
- Grynberg
- Grünberg (disambiguation)
