= Grundberg =

Grundberg is a surname. Notable people with the surname include:

- Andy Grundberg, American photography critic
- Betty Grundberg (born 1938), American politician
- Helena Grundberg (born 1972), Swedish figure skater
- Svante Grundberg (1943–2019), Swedish actor, author, director, and stand-up comedian
- Hans Grundberg (born 1977), Swedish diplomat

== See also ==
- Grünberg (surname)
