= Igor Newerly =

Polish novelist and educator

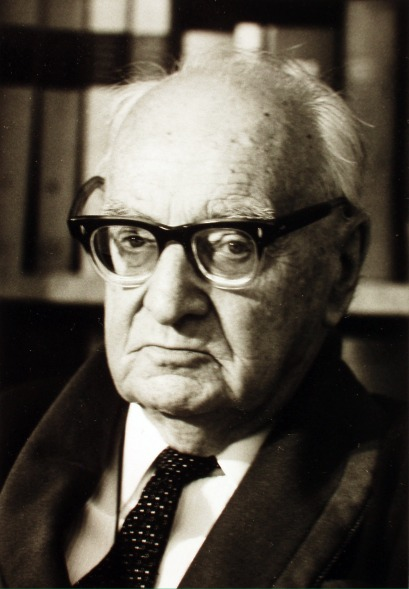
Igor Newerly in 1987

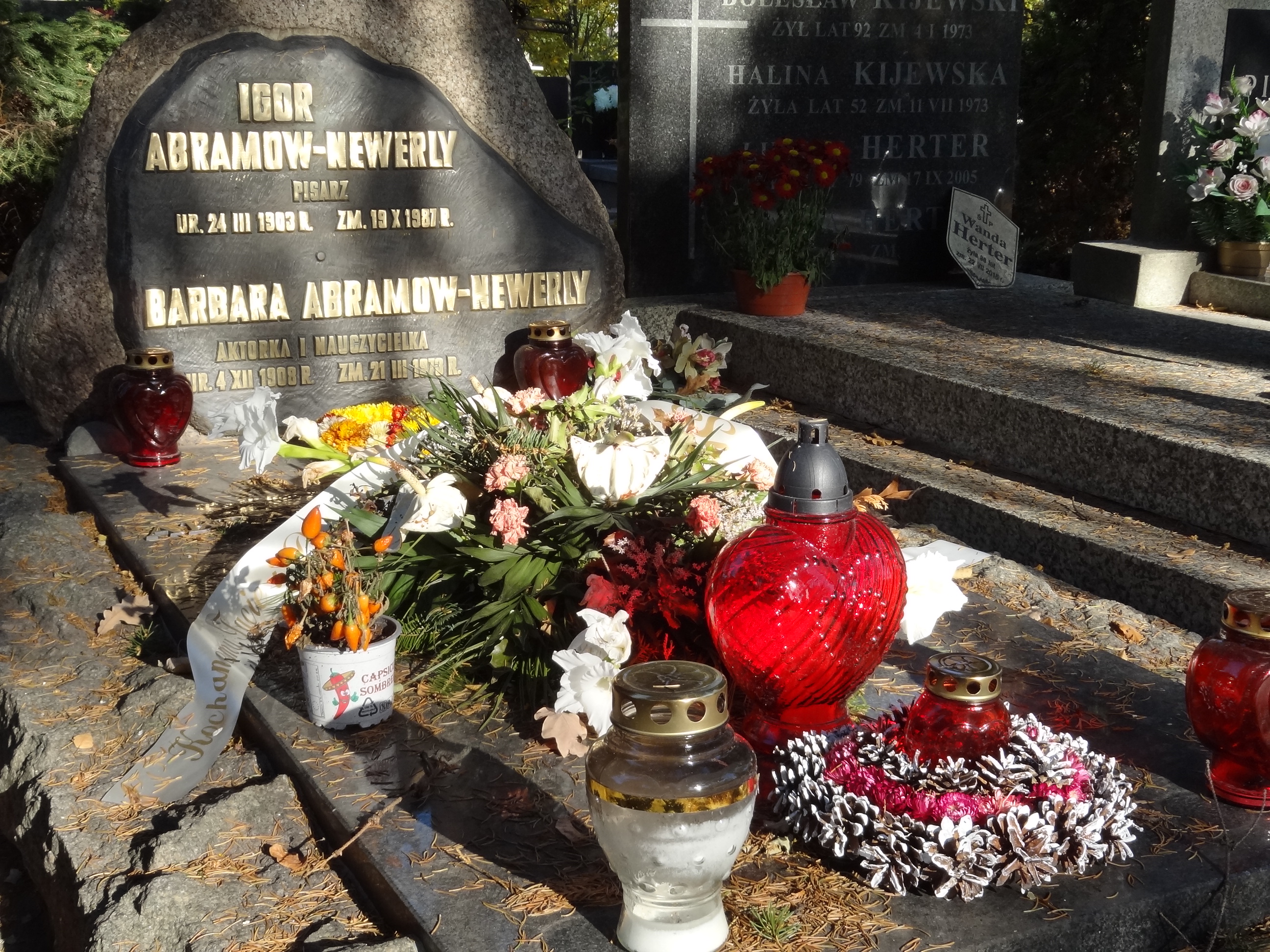
The grave of Igor Newerly and his wife Barbara in Warsaw on the eve of All Saints Day

Igor Newerly or Igor Abramow-Newerly (24 March 1903 – 19 October 1987) was a Polish novelist and educator.

He was born in Białowieża in 1903 into a mixed Czech-Russian family. His grandfather Józef Newerly, was a Czech national, who held a title Master of the Hunt (Russian: Ловчий, Polish: Łowczy) at the court of Tsar Nicholas II of Russia.

Igor Newerly lost one leg as a child. He studied law at Kiev University but he was relegated for political reasons, arrested and sent to Odessa. In 1924 he emigrated illegally to the newly independent Poland and was active in the field of pedagogy in Warsaw. He worked together with the renowned educator Janusz Korczak, and in 1926 became his secretary. From 1932 to 1939 Newerly worked for Mały Przegląd (Little Review). He married Barbara Jarecka.

Under the Nazi German occupation of Poland Newerly was a member of the Polish resistance. He helped Janusz Korczak at his Orphanage and saved his diary of martyrdom. He also hid from Nazi persecution several of his Jewish colleagues from Nasz Przegląd daily – among them Kuba Hersztein – and transported Lejzor Czarnobroda to Warsaw after he escaped from the train to Treblinka and broke his leg. Newerly was arrested at the beginning of 1943 by the German Gestapo and imprisoned at Pawiak in Warsaw. Until the end of the war he was an inmate of Nazi concentration camps: Majdanek, Auschwitz, Oranienburg and Bergen Belsen where he was liberated.

After the war in 1945, he resumed a pedagogical career. Based on Newerly's novel Pamiątka z Celulozy (A Souvenir from the Cellulose Mill), the Polish director Jerzy Kawalerowicz made two films: Celuloza (Cellulose Mill) and Pod gwiazdą frygijską (Under the Phrygian Star).

Newerly died in Warsaw, Polish People's Republic in 1987. His son, Jarosław Abramow-Newerly, is a writer.

== Works ==
- Chłopiec z Salskich Stepów 1948
- Archipelag ludzi odzyskanych 1950
- Pamiątka z Celulozy 1952
- Leśne morze 1960
- Żywe wiązanie 1966
- Rozmowa w sadzie piątego sierpnia, Warszawa, Czytelnik 1978
- Za Opiwardą, za siódmą rzeką..., Warszawa, Czytelnik, ISBN 83-07-01165-5, 1985
- Wzgórze błękitnego snu, Warszawa, Czytelnik, ISBN 83-07-01369-0, 1986
- Zostało z uczty bogów, Paryż, Instytut Literacki, ISBN 2-7168-0085-5, 1986

== Film screen-plays ==
- Król Maciuś I, 1957
- Pod gwiazdą frygijską
- Celuloza, 1953

== Bibliography ==
- Igor Newerly, Zostało z uczty bogów
- Michał Grynberg, Księga Sprawiedliwych (Book of the Righteous), Warsaw, PWN, 1993. (ill., ports., 766 pp.)
