= Grīnberga =

Grīnberga (masculine: Grīnbergs) is a feminine Latvian-language surname, a Latvianization of the Yiddish surname Grinberg. Noptable people with the surname include:

- Ilona Dzelme-Grīnberga (born 1966), Latvian windsurfer
- Jāna Jēruma-Grīnberga (born 1953), Latvian priest-in-charge of St Saviour's Anglican Church in Riga
- Malvīne Vīgnere-Grīnberga (1871-1949), Latvian opera singer and vocal pedagogue
- Maima Grīnberga (born 1969), Latvian translator
