= Grynberg =

Grynberg is a surname. Notable people with the surname include:

- Henryk Grynberg (born 1936), Polish writer and actor
- Jack J. Grynberg (born 1932), Polish-born American businessman
- Michał Grynberg (1909–2000), Polish historian
- Roman Grynberg, Polish professor, author, and academic

== See also ==
- Grinberg
