= Greenburg =

Greenburg is a surname. Notable people with the name include:

- Adrian Greenburg (1903–1959), American costume designer
- Earl Greenburg (1947–2008), former head of NBC Daytime
- Dan Greenburg (born 1936), American author and screenwriter
- Jack Carl Greenburg (1909–1990), Los Angeles attorney
- Jan Crawford Greenburg (born 1965), legal correspondent for ABC News
- J. C. Greenburg, author of the Andrew Lost children's books
- Jennifer Greenburg (born 1977), American photographer
- Ross Greenburg (born c. 1955), president of HBO Sports
- Zack O'Malley Greenburg (born 1985), American writer

== See also ==
- Greensburg (disambiguation)
- Greenberg
- Grünburg
