= Brunn an der Wild =

- Municipality
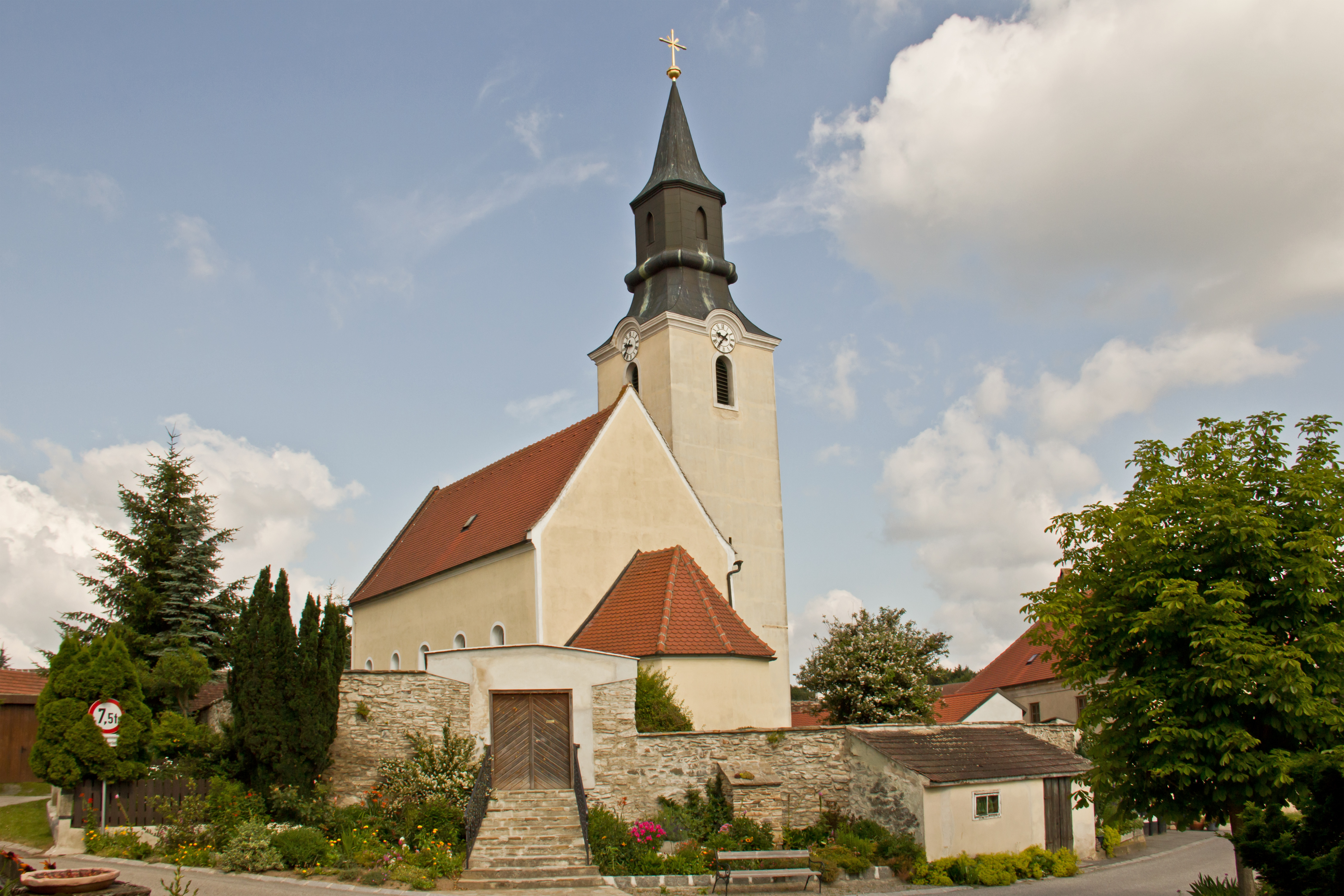
- Parish church of Dietmannsdorf (part of Brunn and der Wild)

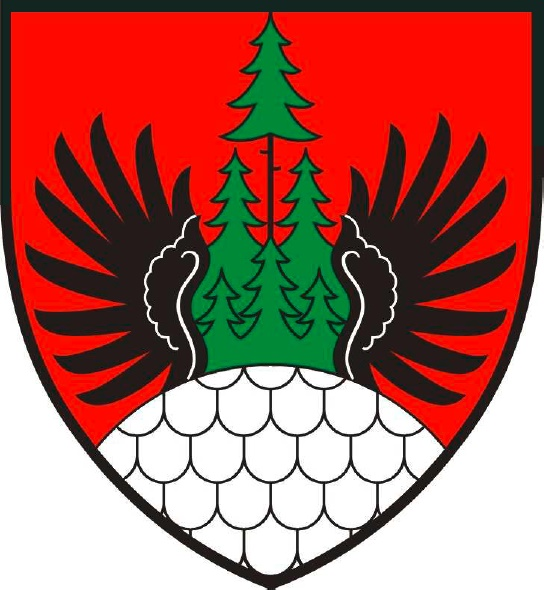
- Coat of arms

- Location within Austria
- Coordinates: 48°42′N 15°31′E
- Country: Austria
- State: Lower Austria
- District: Horn

Government
  - Mayor: Josef Gumpinger

Area
  - Total: 32.01 km^{2} (12.36 sq mi)
- Elevation: 442 m (1,450 ft)

Population (2018-01-01)
  - Total: 826
  - Density: 25.8/km^{2} (66.8/sq mi)
- Time zone: UTC+1 (CET)
  - Summer (DST): UTC+2 (CEST)
- Postal code: 3595
- Area code: 02989

Brunn an der Wild is a town in the district of Horn in Lower Austria, Austria.

== Geography ==
Brunn an der Wild lies in the Waldviertel in Lower Austria, about 11 km west of Horn, Austria. About 27.47 percent of the municipality is forested.
