= Langau =

- Municipality
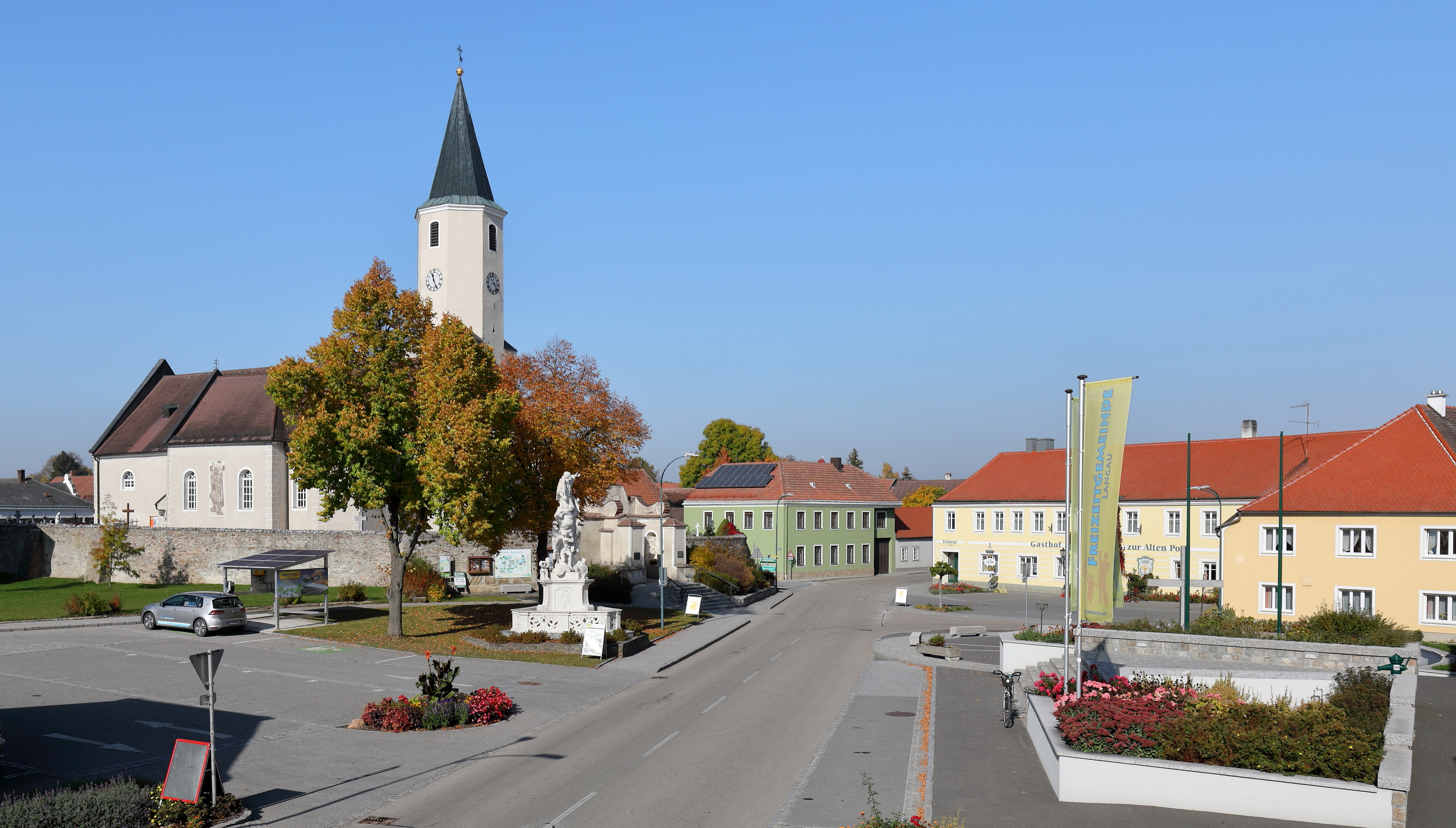

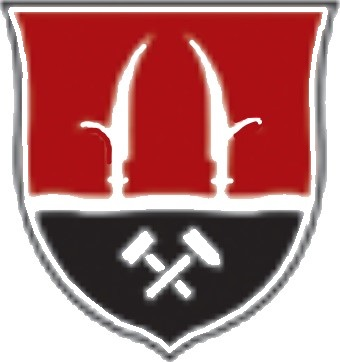
- Coat of arms

- Location within Austria
- Coordinates: 48°49′N 15°42′E
- Country: Austria
- State: Lower Austria
- District: Horn

Government
  - Mayor: Daniel Mayerhofer

Area
  - Total: 22.22 km^{2} (8.58 sq mi)
- Elevation: 450 m (1,480 ft)

Population (2018-01-01)
  - Total: 673
  - Density: 30.3/km^{2} (78.4/sq mi)
- Time zone: UTC+1 (CET)
  - Summer (DST): UTC+2 (CEST)
- Postal code: 2091
- Area code: 02912
- Website: www.langau.at

Langau is a town in the district of Horn in Lower Austria, Austria.

== Population ==
Historical population
Year	Pop.	±%
1923	989	—
1951	1,294	+30.8%
1961	1,313	+1.5%
1971	1,042	−20.6%
1981	892	−14.4%
1991	763	−14.5%
2001	686	−10.1%
2011	989	+44.2%
