= Röschitz =

- Municipality
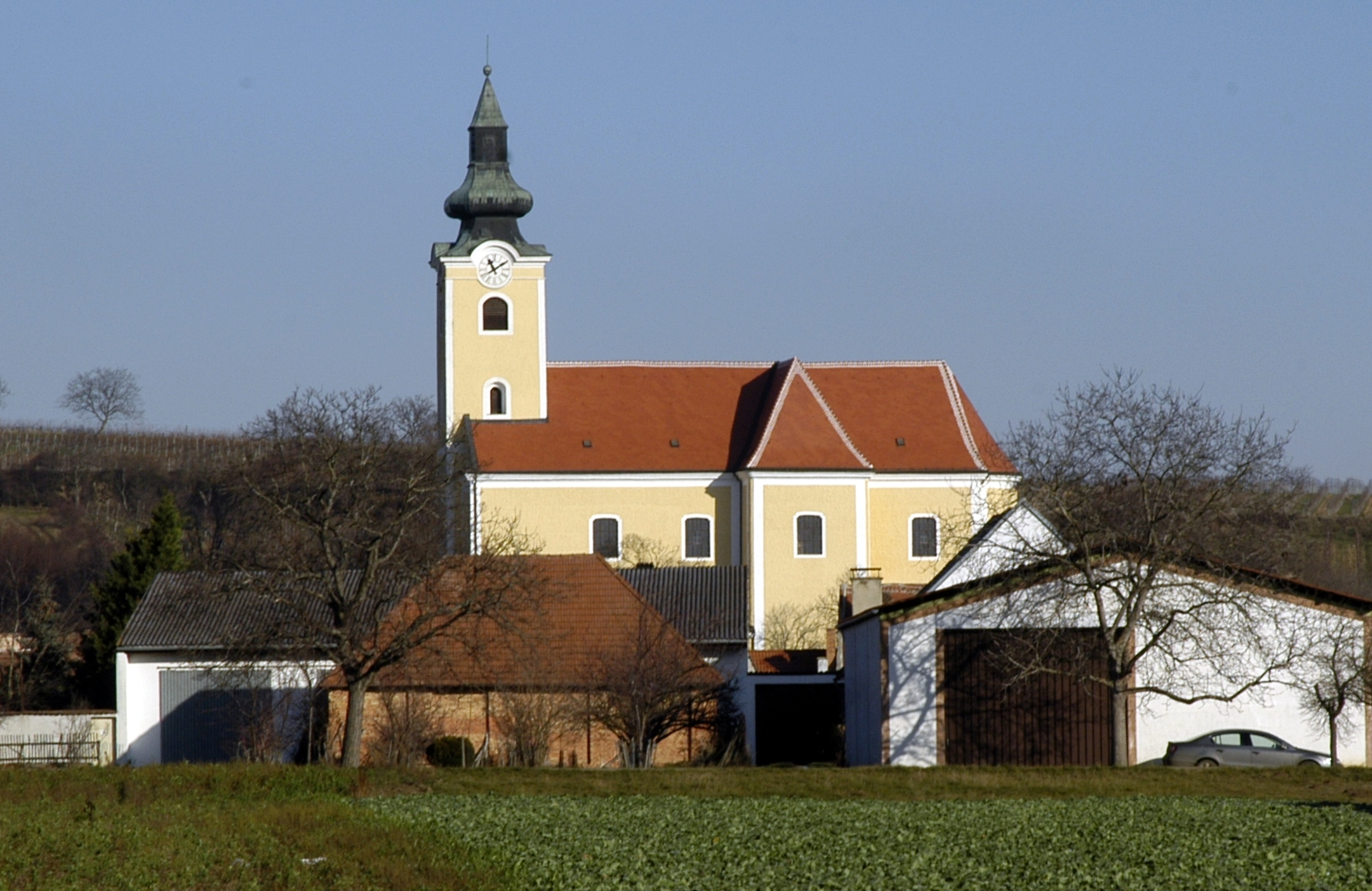
- Röschitz parish church

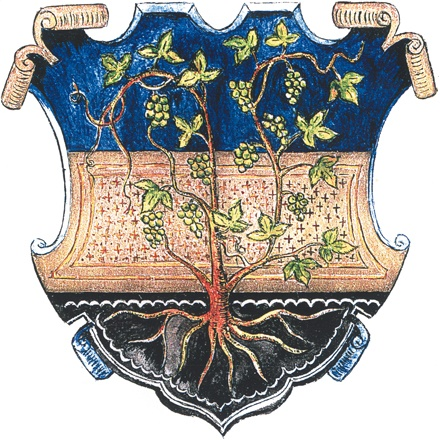
- Coat of arms

- Location within Austria
- Coordinates: 48°40′N 15°53′E
- Country: Austria
- State: Lower Austria
- District: Horn

Government
  - Mayor: Erwin Krottendorfer

Area
  - Total: 21.17 km^{2} (8.17 sq mi)
- Elevation: 280 m (920 ft)

Population (2018-01-01)
  - Total: 1,052
  - Density: 49.69/km^{2} (128.7/sq mi)
- Time zone: UTC+1 (CET)
  - Summer (DST): UTC+2 (CEST)
- Postal code: 3743
- Area code: +43 2984
- Website: www.roeschitz.at

Röschitz is a village in the district of Horn in Lower Austria, Austria.

== Population ==
Historical population
Year	Pop.	±%
1869	1,837	—
1923	1,370	−25.4%
1951	1,588	+15.9%
1971	1,370	−13.7%
1981	1,200	−12.4%
1991	1,165	−2.9%
2001	1,063	−8.8%
2011	1,038	−2.4%
2016	1,053	+1.4%
