= Horn District =

Coordinates: 48.6639°N 15.6572°E

Horn District Bezirk Horn
- District
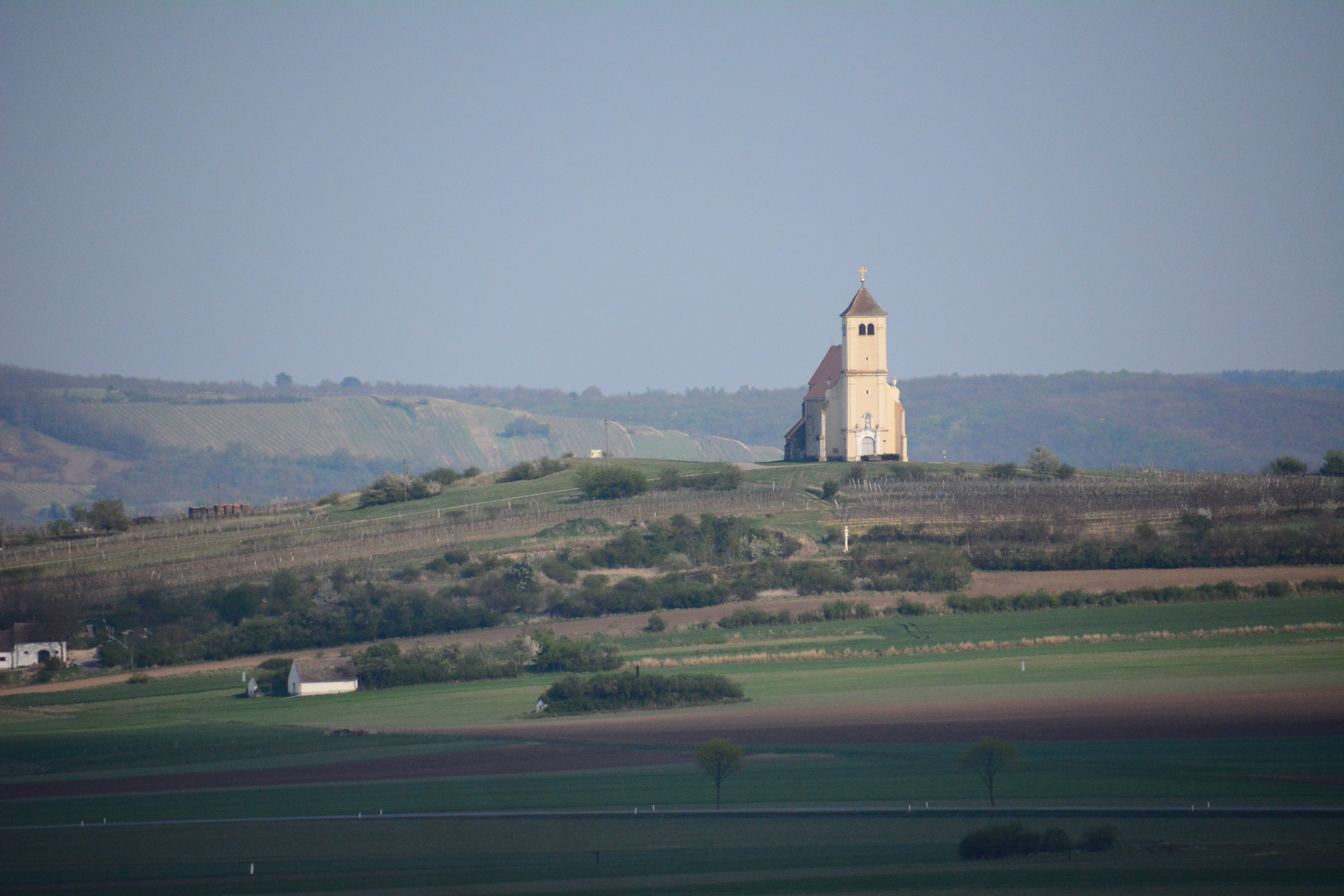
- Wartberg church. This part of Horn county is located in the Weinviertel part of Lower Austria.
- Country: Austria
- State: Lower Austria
- Number of municipalities: 20
- Administrative seat: Horn

Government
  - District Governor: Stefan Grusch (since 2023)

Area
  - Total: 784.0 km^{2} (302.7 sq mi)

Population (2024)
  - Total: 31,052
  - Density: 39.61/km^{2} (102.6/sq mi)
- Time zone: UTC+01:00 (CET)
  - Summer (DST): UTC+02:00 (CEST)
- Vehicle registration: HO
- NUTS code: AT124
- District code: 311

Bezirk Horn is a district of the state of Lower Austria in Austria.

== Municipalities ==
Towns (Städte) are indicated in boldface; market towns (Marktgemeinden) in italics; suburbs, hamlets and other subdivisions of a municipality are indicated in small characters.

- Altenburg
  - Altenburg, Burgerwiesen, Fuglau, Mahrersdorf, Steinegg
- Brunn an der Wild
  - Atzelsdorf, Brunn an der Wild, Dappach, Dietmannsdorf an der Wild, Frankenreith, Fürwald, Neukirchen an der Wild, St. Marein, Waiden, Wutzendorf
- Burgschleinitz-Kühnring
  - Amelsdorf, Burgschleinitz, Buttendorf, Harmannsdorf, Kühnring, Matzelsdorf, Reinprechtspölla, Sachsendorf, Sonndorf, Zogelsdorf
- **Drosendorf-Zissersdorf**
  - Autendorf, Drosendorf Altstadt, Drosendorf Stadt, Elsern, Heinrichsreith, Oberthürnau, Pingendorf, Unterthürnau, Wolfsbach, Wollmersdorf, Zettlitz, Zissersdorf
- **Eggenburg**
  - Eggenburg, Engelsdorf, Gauderndorf, Stoitzendorf
- Gars am Kamp
  - Buchberg am Kamp, Etzmannsdorf am Kamp, Gars am Kamp, Kamegg, Kotzendorf, Loibersdorf, Maiersch, Nonndorf bei Gars, Tautendorf, Thunau am Kamp, Wanzenau, Wolfshof, Zitternberg
- Geras
  - Dallein, Fugnitz, Geras, Goggitsch, Harth, Hötzelsdorf, Kottaun, Pfaffenreith, Purgstall, Schirmannsreith, Sieghartsreith, Trautmannsdorf
- Horn
  - Breiteneich, Doberndorf, Horn, Mödring, Mühlfeld
- Irnfritz-Messern
  - Dorna, Grub, Haselberg, Irnfritz, Klein-Ulrichschlag, Messern, Nondorf an der Wild, Reichharts, Rothweinsdorf, Sitzendorf, Trabenreith, Trabenreith, Wappoltenreith
- Japons
  - Goslarn, Japons, Oberthumeritz, Sabatenreith, Schweinburg, Unterthumeritz, Wenjapons, Zettenreith
- Langau
  - Hessendorf, Langau
- Meiseldorf
  - Kattau, Klein-Meiseldorf, Maigen, Stockern
- Pernegg
  - Etzelsreith, Lehndorf, Ludweishofen, Nödersdorf, Pernegg, Posselsdorf, Raisdorf, Staningersdorf
- Röhrenbach
  - Feinfeld, Germanns, Gobelsdorf, Greillenstein, Neubau, Röhrenbach, Tautendorf, Winkl
- Röschitz
  - Klein-Jetzelsdorf, Klein-Reinprechtsdorf, Roggendorf, Röschitz
- Rosenburg-Mold
  - Mold, Mörtersdorf, Rosenburg, Stallegg, Zaingrub, Maria Dreieichen
- Sigmundsherberg
  - Brugg, Kainreith, Missingdorf, Rodingersdorf, Röhrawiesen, Sigmundsherberg, Theras, Walkenstein
- Sankt Bernhard-Frauenhofen
  - Frauenhofen, Groß Burgstall, Grünberg, Poigen, Poigen, St. Bernhard, Strögen
- Straning-Grafenberg
  - Etzmannsdorf bei Straning, Grafenberg, Straning, Wartberg
- Weitersfeld
  - Fronsburg, Heinrichsdorf, Nonnersdorf, Oberfladnitz, Oberhöflein, Obermixnitz, Prutzendorf, Rassingdorf, Sallapulka, Starrein, Untermixnitz, Weitersfeld
