= Röhrenbach =

- Municipality
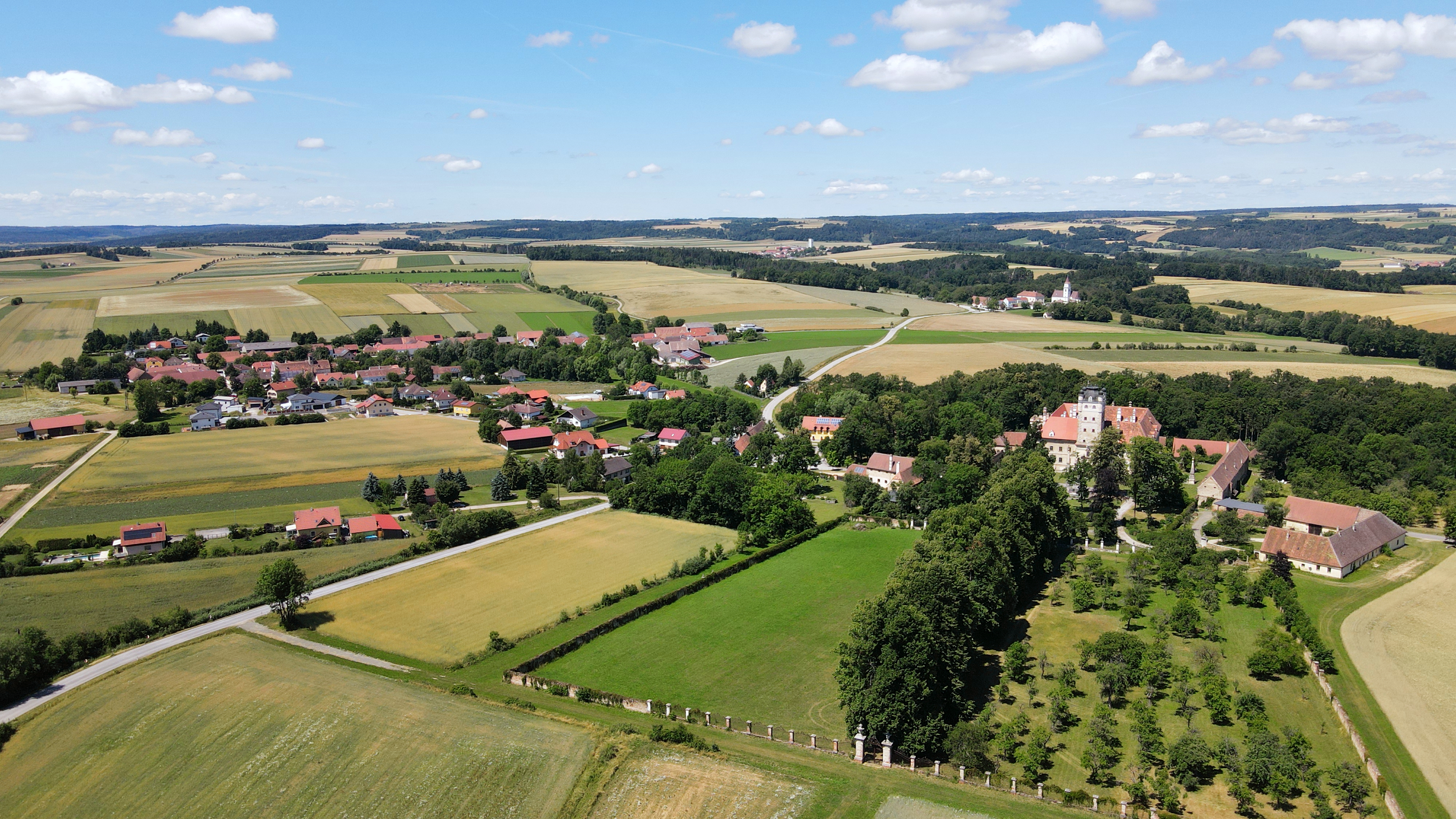
- Aerial view of Röhrenbach, Lower Austria

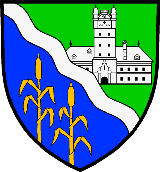
- Coat of arms

- Location within Austria
- Coordinates: 48°39′N 15°31′E
- Country: Austria
- State: Lower Austria
- District: Horn

Government
  - Mayor: Josef Löfler

Area
  - Total: 25.13 km^{2} (9.70 sq mi)
- Elevation: 445 m (1,460 ft)

Population (2018-01-01)
  - Total: 522
  - Density: 20.8/km^{2} (53.8/sq mi)
- Time zone: UTC+1 (CET)
  - Summer (DST): UTC+2 (CEST)
- Postal code: 3592
- Area code: 02989

Röhrenbach is a town in the district of Horn in Lower Austria, Austria.

== Population ==
Historical population
| Year | Pop. | ±% |
|---|---|---|
| 1869 | 1,068 | — |
| 1880 | 1,106 | +3.6% |
| 1890 | 1,051 | −5.0% |
| 1900 | 1,101 | +4.8% |
| 1910 | 1,053 | −4.4% |
| 1923 | 1,083 | +2.8% |
| 1934 | 1,090 | +0.6% |
| 1939 | 1,076 | −1.3% |
| 1951 | 913 | −15.1% |
| 1961 | 865 | −5.3% |
| 1971 | 774 | −10.5% |
| 1981 | 681 | −12.0% |
| 1991 | 602 | −11.6% |
| 2001 | 582 | −3.3% |
| 2011 | 573 | −1.5% |
