= David M. Greenberg =

American psychologist, neuroscientist

- Born: New York, US
- Occupations: Psychologist, neuroscientist
- Website: www.davidmgreenberg.com

David Michael Greenberg is a psychologist, neuroscientist, and musician. He is best known for his contributions to personality psychology, social psychology, social neuroscience, music psychology, and autism.

== Early life ==
Born in New York, Greenberg was raised in the suburbs of Philadelphia. He suffered from a congenital birth defect and was hospitalized when he was two weeks old. During this time, his grandfather sang to him, helping him to recover, which influenced Greenberg's career, as told by Greenberg in a TEDx talk in 2021.

Greenberg began to play saxophone at the age of ten. At age fourteen, he began lessons with Dave LeCompte who taught him improvisational methods from Dennis Sandole, who was John Coltrane's teacher in Philadelphia. He then went on to study with Larry Mckenna, Ralph Bowen, and Joel Frahm. Greenberg went on his first European tour at age sixten.

He studied psychology at Rutgers University, music performance at Mason Gross School of the Arts, and aesthetics at the University of Milan in Italy via the Euroscholars Program. During his undergraduate studies, he completed two honors theses: one on the philosophy of music and the other, a psychobiography of John Coltrane under the supervision of George Atwood, for which he received the award for the best honors thesis.

He graduated first in his class with an MPhil in social and developmental psychology from the University of Cambridge. Then, funded by the International Cambridge Trusts, he obtained his PhD in psychology from the University of Cambridge, where he was supervised by Peter J. Rentfrow, advised by Michael E. Lamb, and collaborated with Simon Baron-Cohen.

Before becoming a Zuckerman Fellow in social neuroscience at the Gonda Brain Sciences Center at Bar-Ilan University, he received postdoctoral clinical training in clinical psychology from the City University of New York, and in music therapy from Anglia Ruskin University. Greenberg received additional training and worked at the New York University Child Study Center and the National Institutes of Health, where he was advised by personality psychologist Robert R. McCrae. He is also a Fellow of the Academy of Medical Sciences' Daniel Turnberg Fellowship. Greenberg's work involves interdisciplinary collaborations with Cambridge University, Harvard University, Stanford University, Columbia University, University of Pennsylvania, and McGill University.

== Career ==
Greenberg is known for his scientific work on musical preferences and personality, the social neuroscience of music, music therapy, and autism. He has received honors from the National Institutes of Health and the European Society for the Cognitive Sciences of Music.

From 2016 to 2020, Greenberg served as a senior scientific advisor/consultant for companies such as Spotify and National Geographic.

In 2017, Greenberg founded Musical Universe, which became an academic and popular science platform engaging 350,000 people in 100 countries. In 2022, Greenberg transitioned the platform to become a healthtech start-up to aid millions of people worldwide through proprietary diagnostic screening technology and telehealth. Musical Universe was accepted into the Crown Ventures Accelerator program in the autumn of 2022.

Greenberg has worked with the Jerusalem Youth Chorus, which brings together Arab-Palestinians and Jewish-Israelis from East and West Jerusalem. He led an initiative called One World in Song, which is an interdisciplinary effort aimed at establishing a scientific basis for the use of music in easing social conflict/ Greenberg chaired its first international symposium in July 2021.

Greenberg now serves on the editorial boards of the Journal of Music Therapy and Musicae Scientiae. He often appears as a guest on BBC, NPR, CBS, ABC News and other media outlets. He is also a musician and songwriter who continues to perform regularly under his Hebrew name, Yeshaya David.

=== Scientific research ===
In 2016, Greenberg developed a new model for understanding music perception, called the arousal-valence-depth (AVD) model of musical attributes, published in Social Psychological and Personality Science. The study co-authors included Peter J. Rentfrow at Cambridge University and neuroscientist Daniel Levitin at McGill University. The AVD model was replicated in 2017, 2018, 2019, and 2021 and has since been used in studies on musical preferences and analgesia.

In 2018, Greenberg published the largest study to date of autistic traits and autism, in the Proceedings of the National Academy of Sciences, with 634,958 typical individuals and 36,648 autistic individuals. The study showed that autistic individuals on-average have greater D-scores (drive to systemize) than typical individuals, and that D-scores account for 18 times more variance in autistic traits than do sex differences. The study was co-authored by Simon Baron-Cohen at the Autism Research Centre of Cambridge University. Greenberg and his colleagues extended these findings to cisgender individuals, transgender, and gender-diverse individuals, published in Nature Communications. Greenberg is currently leading as a Co-PI, the first nationwide randomized controlled trial (RCT) of improvisational music therapy with autistic children in the UK. The study has raised US$1.7 million and is funded by the Autism Research Trust and Rosetrees Trust.

In 2020, Greenberg formulated and tested a social psychological theory called the self-congruity effect of music, published in the Journal of Journal of Personality and Social Psychology. The study showed that people prefer music of artists who have perceived personalities similar to themselves and that musical preferences are driven by the personality-fit between the listener and the artist, rather than pure musical preferences alone. The study included 86,570 participants and was co-authored by Sandra Matz at Columbia Business School.

In 2021, Greenberg published one of the first articles on the "social neuroscience of music" (in contrast to the cognitive neuroscience of music). Published in the American Psychologist, he showed that the social brain networks implicated in music production (in contrast to music listening) overlap with the networks in the brain implicated in the social processes of human cognition—mentalization, empathy, and synchrony. The article was co-authored by neuroscientist Jean Decety at the University of Chicago, and Ilaniit Gordon at Bar-Ilan University.

In 2022, Greenberg published the largest cross-cultural study to date on music in the Journal of Personality and Social-Psychology, with 356,649 participants across 53 countries. The study used both audio-based and genre-based methods to show that the patterns in correlations between personality traits and Western musical preferences are invariant (i.e., universal) across countries.

In 2022, Greenberg published the largest study to date on theory of mind in the Proceedings of the National Academy of Sciences with 305,726 participants across 57 countries. The study validated sex differences in theory of mind using the popular "reading the mind in the eyes test." The study showed that females, on average, score higher than males on the theory of mind across ages and countries. The study was a collaboration with Cambridge-University, Harvard University, and Bar-Ilan-University.

== Publications ==
=== Selected book chapters ===
- McCrae R., R., & Greenberg, D. M. (2014). Openness to experience. In D. K. Simonton (Ed.), The Wiley-Blackwell Handbook of Genius. Oxford, UK: Wiley-Blackwell.
- Greenberg, D. M. & Rentfrow, P. J. (2017). The social psychological underpinnings of musical identities: A study on how personality stereotypes are formed from musical cues. In R. MacDonald, D. Miell, & D. Hargreaves (Eds.), The Oxford Handbook of Musical Identities. Oxford, UK: Oxford University Press.
- Rentfrow, P. J., & Greenberg, D. M. (2019). The social psychology of music. In P. J. Rentfrow & D. J. Levitin (Eds.), Foundations in Music Psychology: Theory and Research. MIT Press.
- Greenberg, D. M. (2021). Music, spirituality, and ecstatic states. In W. Forde Thompson & K. Olsen (Eds.), The Science and Psychology of Music: From Beethoven at the Office to Beyoncé at the Gym. ABC-CLIO.

=== Selected journal articles ===
- Greenberg, D. M., Warrier, V., Abu-Akel, A., Allison, C., Gajos, K. Z., Reinecke, K., Rentfrow, P. J., Radecki, M., & Baron-Cohen, S. (2022). Sex and age differences in 'theory of mind' across 57 countries using the English version of 'Reading the Mind in the Eyes' test. Proceedings of the National Academy of Sciences, 120(1), e2022385119.
- Greenberg, D. M., Wride, S. J., Snowden, D. A., Spathis, D., Potter, J., & Rentfrow, P. J. (2022). Universals and variations in musical preferences: A study of preferential reactions to Western music in 53 countries. Journal of Personality and Social Psychology, 122(2), 286–309.
- Greenberg, D. M., Decety, J., & Gordon, I. (2021). The social neuroscience of music: Understanding the social brain through human song. The American Psychologist, 76(7), 1172–1185.
- Greenberg, D. M., Bodner, E., Shrira, A., & Fricke K. R. (2021). Decreasing stress through a spatial audio and immersive 3D environment: A pilot study with implications for clinical and medical settings. Music & Science, 4, 2059204321993992.
- Greenberg, D. M., Matz, S., Schwartz, H. A., & Fricke, K. R. (2020). The self-congruity effect of music. Journal of Personality and Social Psychology. 121(1), 137–150.
- Anderson, I., Gil, S., Gibson, C., Shapiro, W., Wolf, S., Semerci, O., & Greenberg, D. M. (2020). "Just the Way You Are": Linking Music Listening on Spotify and Personality. Social Psychological and Personality Science, 12(4), 561–572.
- Nave, G., Minxha, J., Greenberg, D. M., Kosinski, M., Stillwell, D. J., Rentfrow, P. J. (2018). Musical preferences predict personality: Evidence from active listening and Facebook likes. Psychological Science, 29(7), 1145–1158.
- Greenberg, D. M., Warrier, V., Allison, C., & Baron-Cohen, S. (2018). Testing the Empathizing-Systemizing theory of sex differences and the Extreme Male Brain theory of autism in half a million people. Proceedings of the National Academy of Sciences, 115(48), 12152–12157.
- Greenberg, D. M. & Rentfrow, P. J. (2017). Music and big data: A new frontier. Current Opinion in Behavioral Sciences, 18, 50–56.
- Greenberg, D. M., Kosinski, M.C, Stillwell, D. J., Monteiro, B. L., Levitin, D. J., & Rentfrow, P. J. (2016). The song is you: Preferences for musical attribute dimensions reflects personality. Social Psychological and Personality Science, 7(6), 597–605.
- Greenberg, D. M., Rentfrow, P. J., & Baron-Cohen, S. (2015). Can music increase empathy? Interpreting musical experience through the Empathizing-Systemizing (E-S) theory: Implications for autism. Empirical Musicology Review, 10(1), 80–95.
- Greenberg, D. M., Baron-Cohen, S., Stillwell, D. J., Kosinski, M., & Rentfrow, P. J. (2015). Musical preferences are linked to cognitive styles. PLoS ONE. 10(7), e01311.
