= Grīnbergs =

Grīnbergs (feminine: Grīnberga) is a masculine Latvian-language surname, a Latvianization of the Yiddish surname Grinberg.

- Emanuels Grīnbergs
- Ojārs Grīnbergs
- Ralfs Grīnbergs
- Teodors Grīnbergs
- Teodors Grīnbergs, birth name of Teodors Zaļkalns
