= Sigmundsherberg =

- Municipality
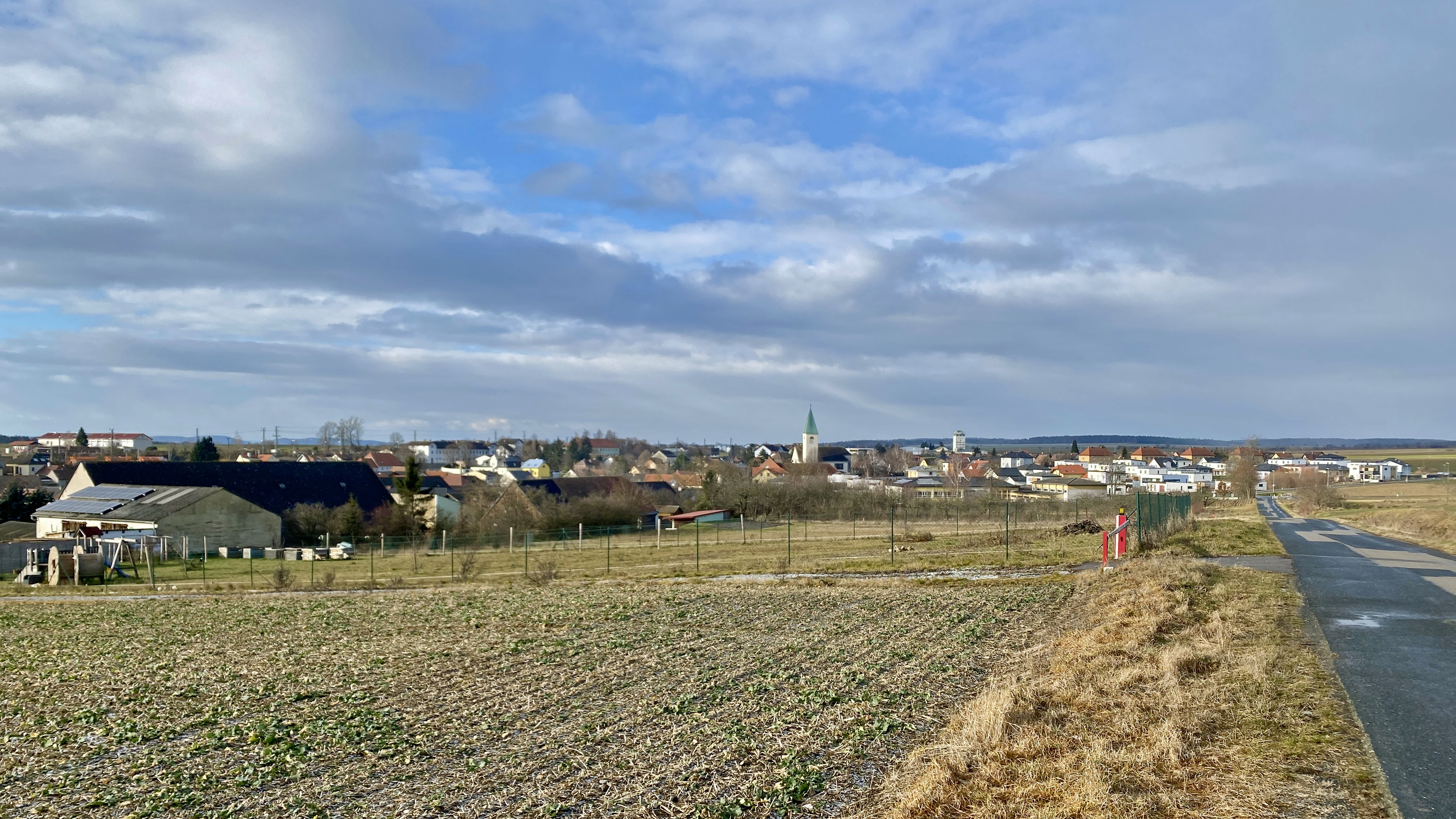
- View of Sigmundsherberg

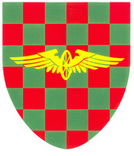
- Coat of arms

- Location within Austria
- Coordinates: 48°41′10″N 15°44′47″E
- Country: Austria
- State: Lower Austria
- District: Horn

Government
  - Mayor: Franz Göd (ÖVP)

Area
  - Total: 47.95 km^{2} (18.51 sq mi)
- Elevation: 429 m (1,407 ft)

Population (2018-01-01)
  - Total: 1,651
  - Density: 34.43/km^{2} (89.18/sq mi)
- Time zone: UTC+1 (CET)
  - Summer (DST): UTC+2 (CEST)
- Postal code: 3751
- Area code: 02983
- Vehicle registration: HO
- Website: www.sigmundsherberg.gv.at

Sigmundsherberg is a municipality in the district of Horn in Lower Austria, Austria.

== Population ==
Historical population
Year	Pop.	±%
1869	1,860	—
1880	1,985	+6.7%
1890	2,085	+5.0%
1900	2,362	+13.3%
1910	2,489	+5.4%
1923	2,861	+14.9%
1934	2,738	−4.3%
1939	2,593	−5.3%
1951	2,506	−3.4%
1961	2,426	−3.2%
1971	2,035	−16.1%
1981	1,887	−7.3%
1991	1,887	+0.0%
2001	1,802	−4.5%
2011	1,667	−7.5%
