= Grimberg =

Grimberg is a toponymic surname. Notable people with the surname include:

- Anders Grimberg (born 1960), Swedish football manager
- Arenda Grimberg (born 1978), Dutch cyclist
- Carl Grimberg (1875–1941), Swedish historian
- Fabian Grimberg (born 1962), Argentine football player
- Steven D. Grimberg (born 1974), American judge
- Tina Grimberg (born 1963), Ukrainian-born Canadian rabbi
- Vanessa Grimberg (born 1993), German swimmer

== See also ==
- nl:Grimberg, a manor near Almelo, Netherlands
- Grimberg, a former village, now central neighborhood of Lohmar, North Rhine-Westphalia
- Port Grimberg, named after the nearby former Castle Grimberg, North Rhine-Westphalia
- Grimbergen, Belgium
- Grinberg (surname)
