= Meiseldorf =

- Municipality
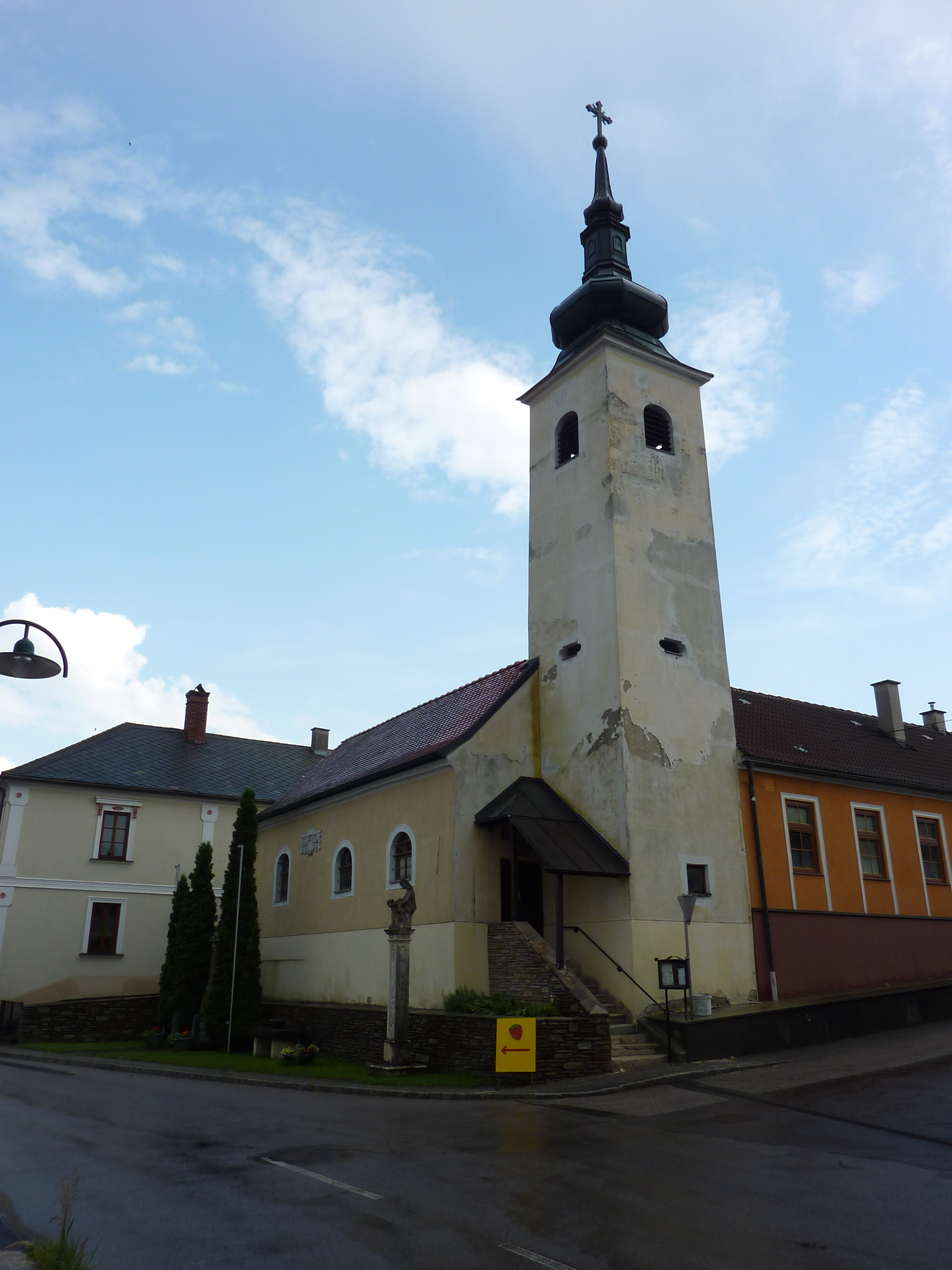
- Kleinmeiseldorf chapel

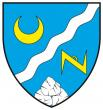
- Coat of arms

- Location within Austria
- Coordinates: 48°40′N 15°45′E
- Country: Austria
- State: Lower Austria
- District: Horn

Government
  - Mayor: Niko Reisel

Area
  - Total: 35.43 km^{2} (13.68 sq mi)
- Elevation: 398 m (1,306 ft)

Population (2018-01-01)
  - Total: 876
  - Density: 24.7/km^{2} (64.0/sq mi)
- Time zone: UTC+1 (CET)
  - Summer (DST): UTC+2 (CEST)
- Postal code: 3744
- Area code: 02983
- Website: www.meiseldorf.at

Meiseldorf is a town in the district of Horn in Lower Austria, Austria.

== Population ==
Historical population
Year	Pop.	±%
1923	1,412	—
1951	1,330	−5.8%
1961	1,141	−14.2%
1971	1,033	−9.5%
1981	917	−11.2%
1991	915	−0.2%
2001	962	+5.1%
2009	941	−2.2%
