= Straning-Grafenberg =

- Municipality
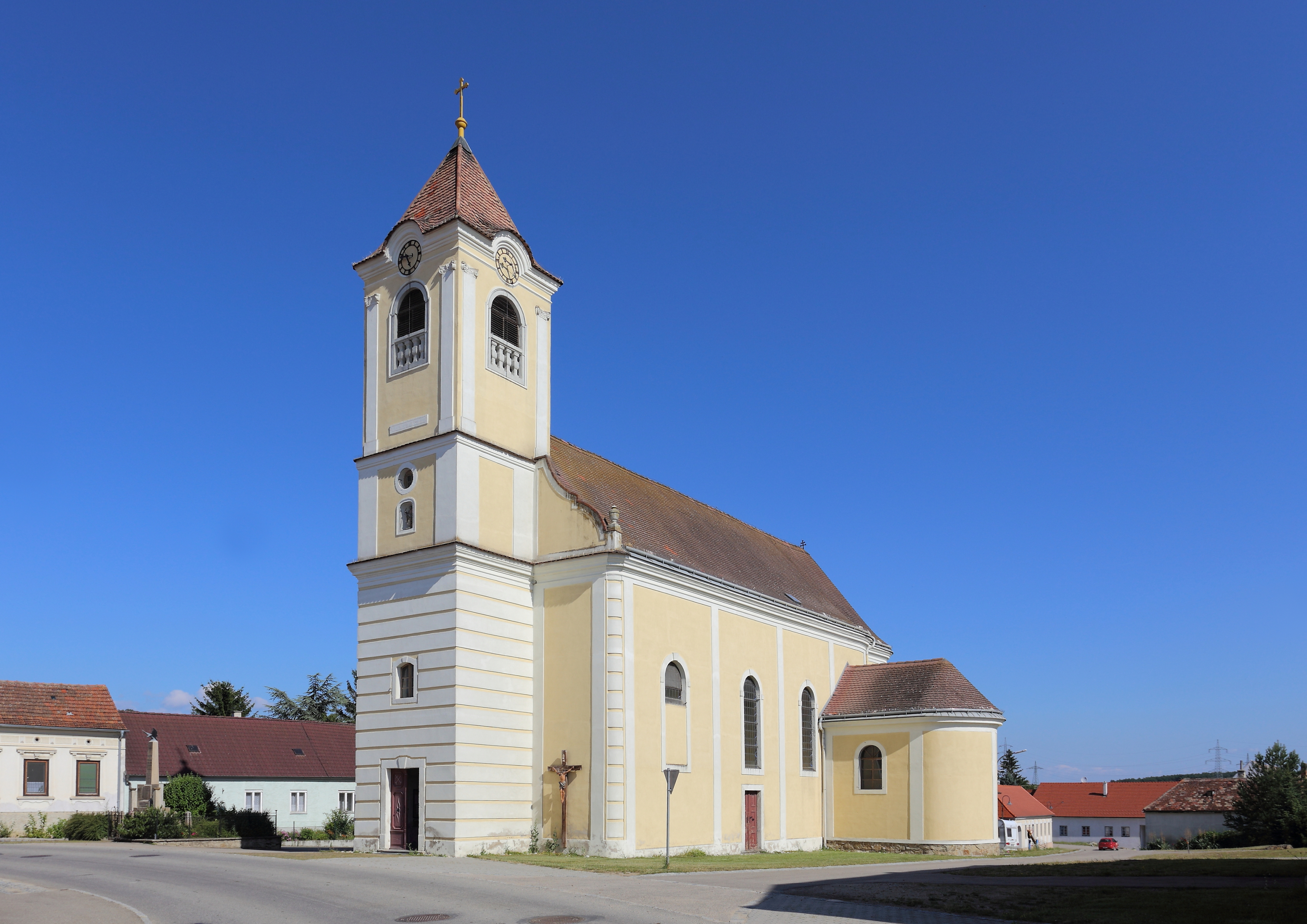
- Grafenberg church

- Coat of arms

- Location within Austria
- Coordinates: 48°37′14″N 15°51′24″E
- Country: Austria
- State: Lower Austria
- District: Horn

Government
  - Mayor: Albert Holluger (ÖVP)

Area
  - Total: 26.47 km^{2} (10.22 sq mi)
- Elevation: 292 m (958 ft)

Population (2018-01-01)
  - Total: 781
  - Density: 29.5/km^{2} (76.4/sq mi)
- Time zone: UTC+1 (CET)
  - Summer (DST): UTC+2 (CEST)
- Postal code: 3722
- Area code: 02984
- Vehicle registration: HO
- Website: www.straning-grafenberg.at

Straning-Grafenberg is a municipality in the district of Horn in Lower Austria, Austria.

== Geography ==
Straning-Grafenberg lies on the border between the Weinviertel and the Waldviertel in Lower Austria. About 7.5 percent of the municipality is forested.
