= Japons =

- Municipality
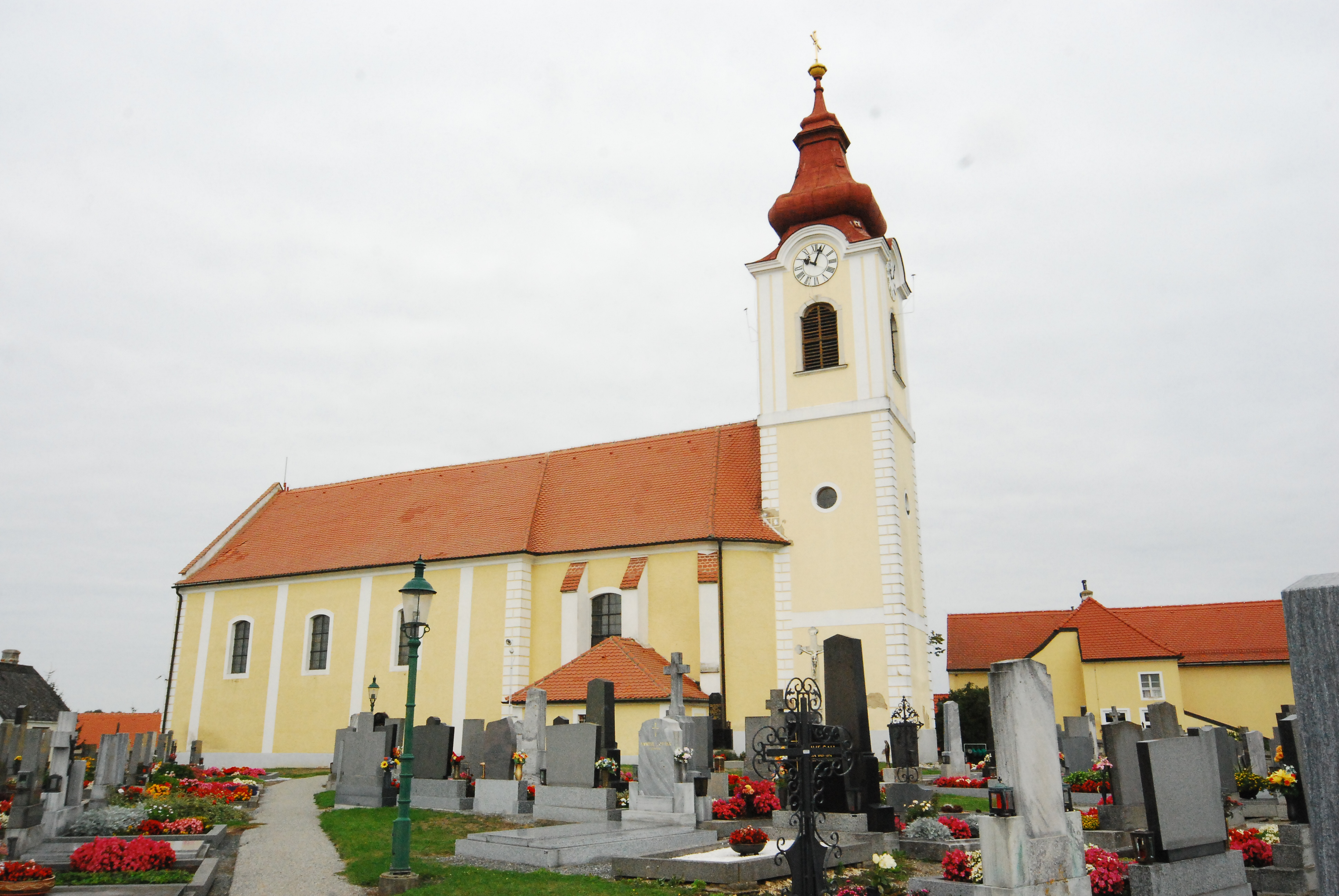
- Japons parish church

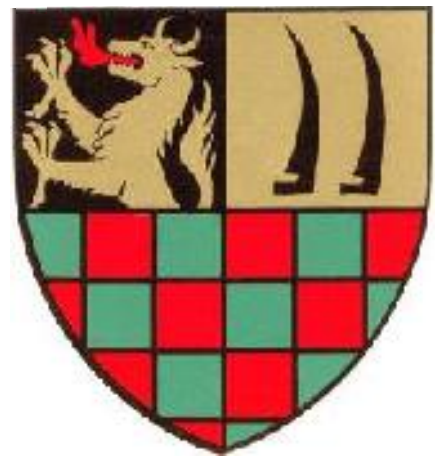
- Coat of arms

- Location within Austria
- Coordinates: 48°48′N 15°34′E
- Country: Austria
- State: Lower Austria
- District: Horn

Government
  - Mayor: Karl Braunsteiner

Area
  - Total: 29.38 km^{2} (11.34 sq mi)
- Elevation: 525 m (1,722 ft)

Population (2018-01-01)
  - Total: 733
  - Density: 24.9/km^{2} (64.6/sq mi)
- Time zone: UTC+1 (CET)
  - Summer (DST): UTC+2 (CEST)
- Postal code: 3763
- Area code: 02914
- Website: www.japons.at

Japons is a town in the district of Horn in Lower Austria, Austria.

== Population ==
Historical population
Year	Pop.	±%
1923	1,356	—
1951	1,138	−16.1%
1961	1,056	−7.2%
1971	1,038	−1.7%
1981	1,012	−2.5%
1991	858	−15.2%
2001	798	−7.0%
2011	742	−7.0%
