= Altenburg, Lower Austria =

Altenburg
- Municipality
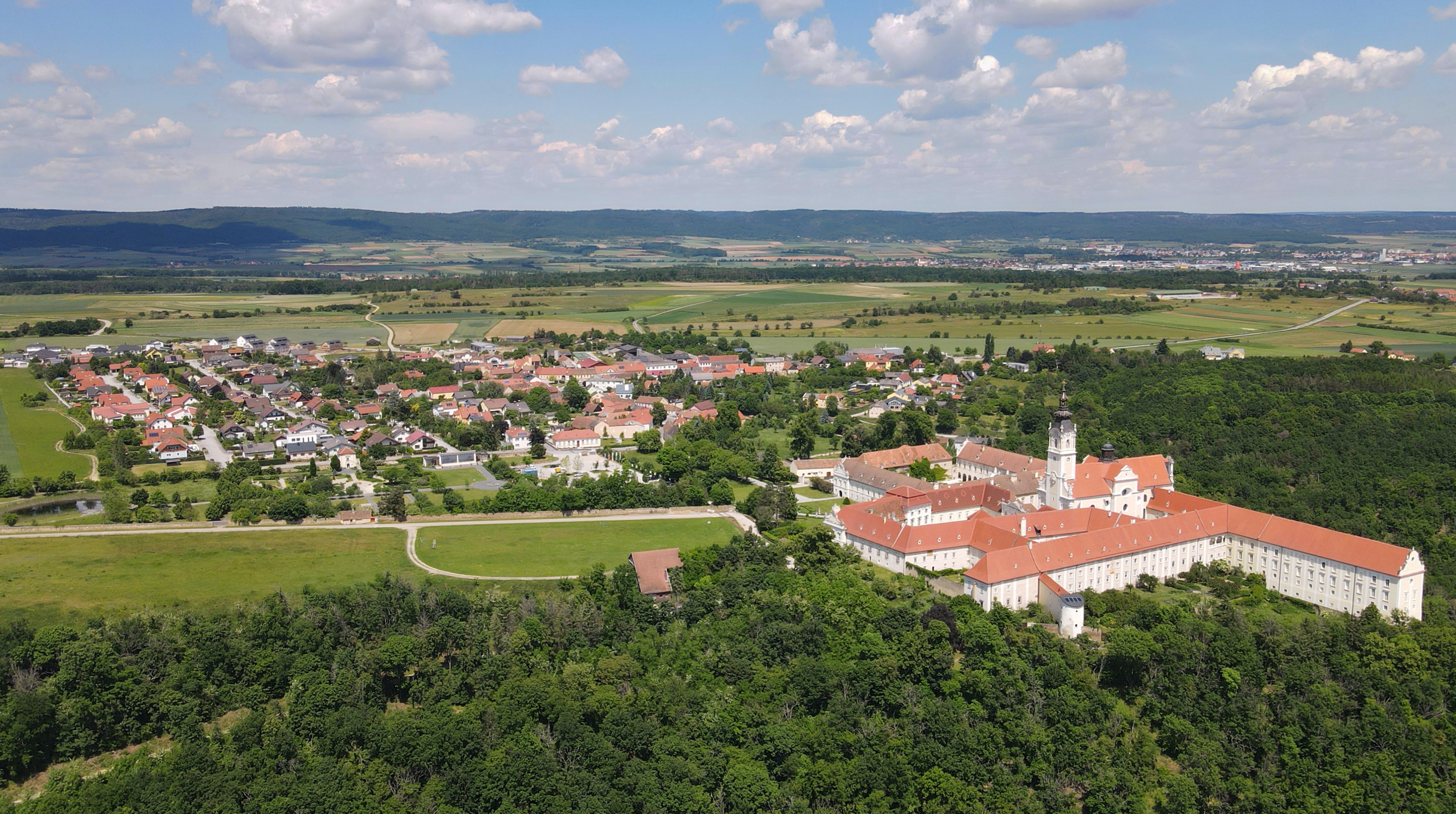
- Aerial view of Altenburg, Lower Austria

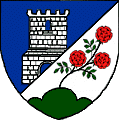
- Coat of arms

- Location within Austria
- Coordinates: 48°39′N 15°35′E
- Country: Austria
- State: Lower Austria
- District: Horn

Government
  - Mayor: Markus Reichenvater

Area
  - Total: 28.12 km^{2} (10.86 sq mi)
- Elevation: 388 m (1,273 ft)

Population (2018-01-01)
  - Total: 828
  - Density: 29.4/km^{2} (76.3/sq mi)
- Time zone: UTC+1 (CET)
  - Summer (DST): UTC+2 (CEST)
- Postal code: 3591
- Area code: 02982
- Website: www.altenburg.gv.at

Altenburg is a municipality in the district of Horn in Lower Austria, Austria.

It is the location of the important 12C Benedictine Altenburg Abbey.

== Population ==
Historical population
Year	Pop.	±%
1869	903	—
1880	893	−1.1%
1890	920	+3.0%
1900	908	−1.3%
1910	858	−5.5%
1923	974	+13.5%
1934	868	−10.9%
1939	852	−1.8%
1951	826	−3.1%
1961	764	−7.5%
1971	714	−6.5%
1981	701	−1.8%
1991	737	+5.1%
2001	814	+10.4%
2012	819	+0.6%
