= Iosif Grinberg =

Soviet literary critic

Iosif Lvovich Grinberg (Russian: Иосиф Львович Гринберг; 1906 – 1980) was a Soviet literary critic.

An alumnus of Leningrad State University, he began his career in 1931 and was member of the Union of Soviet Writers. He is most well known for his commentary on various Soviet poets, including Vera Inber, to whom he devoted a full-scale critical work.
