= Sergiu-Henric Grünberg =

Romanian chess player

Personal information
- Born: 27 July 1947 (age 78) Bucharest, Romania

Chess career
- Country: Romania
- Title: International Master (1985)
- Peak rating: 2425 (January 1987)

Sergiu-Henric Grünberg (born 27 July 1947) is a Romanian chess player, International Master (IM) (1985), Romanian Chess Championship winner (1985).

== Chess career ==
In the 1980s, Sergiu-Henric Grünberg was one of the leading Romanian chess players. 22 times he reached the final stage of the Romanian Chess Championships and gold (1985) and bronze (1978) medals. With chess clubs University of Bucharest and AEM Timisoara he ten times won Romanian Chess Team Championships.

Sergiu-Henric Grünberg represented the Romanian team in 1st World Team Chess Championship in Lucerne.

In 1985, Sergiu-Henric Grünberg was awarded the FIDE International Master (IM) title.

From 1980 he started chess training, first young people and later also adults. Sergiu-Henric Grünberg worked as a trainer at AEM-LUXTEN in Timișoara, where he also held the title of chess club president. Between the 1982–1998 he was a member of the Central Collegium of trainers in Romanian Chess Federation and from 2006 its president. In the 1990–1992 and 1996–2001 he was the Vice President of the Romanian Chess Federation.

== Personal life ==
In 1970 Sergiu-Henric Grünberg successfully graduated from the Politehnica University of Bucharest Faculty of Electrical Engineering. He is father of Mihai-Lucian Grünberg (born 1976) who won Romanian Chess Championship in 2003.
