= Roman Grynberg =

- Born: Sokołów Podlaski, Poland

Academic work
- Discipline: International Trade; Commodities
- Institutions: University of Namibia

Roman Grynberg is a Polish-born professor of economics, author and academic at the University of Namibia's Faculty of Economic and Management Sciences. He has written economics papers on SACU and is specialised in international trade and commodities, and has written several research papers in the disciplines. He is also a regular columnist for The Namibian and has written for the Mail & Guardian on macroeconomic concepts.

== Career ==
Grynberg has taught economics at different universities across the world including in Papua New Guinea at the University of Papua New Guinea, University of the South Pacific in Asia and Botswana. He lives in Windhoek, Namibia.
