= Alan Greenberg =

Alan Greenberg is the name of:

- Alan C. Greenberg (1927–2014), former chairman of the executive committee of The Bear Stearns Companies, Inc.
- Alan Greenberg (businessman) (born 1947), president of Avenues: The World School
- Alan Greenberg (film director) (1950–2015), American film director, screenwriter, photographer and author

== See also ==
- Allan Greenberg (born 1938), architect
