= St. Bernhard-Frauenhofen =

Sankt Bernhard-Frauenhofen
- Municipality
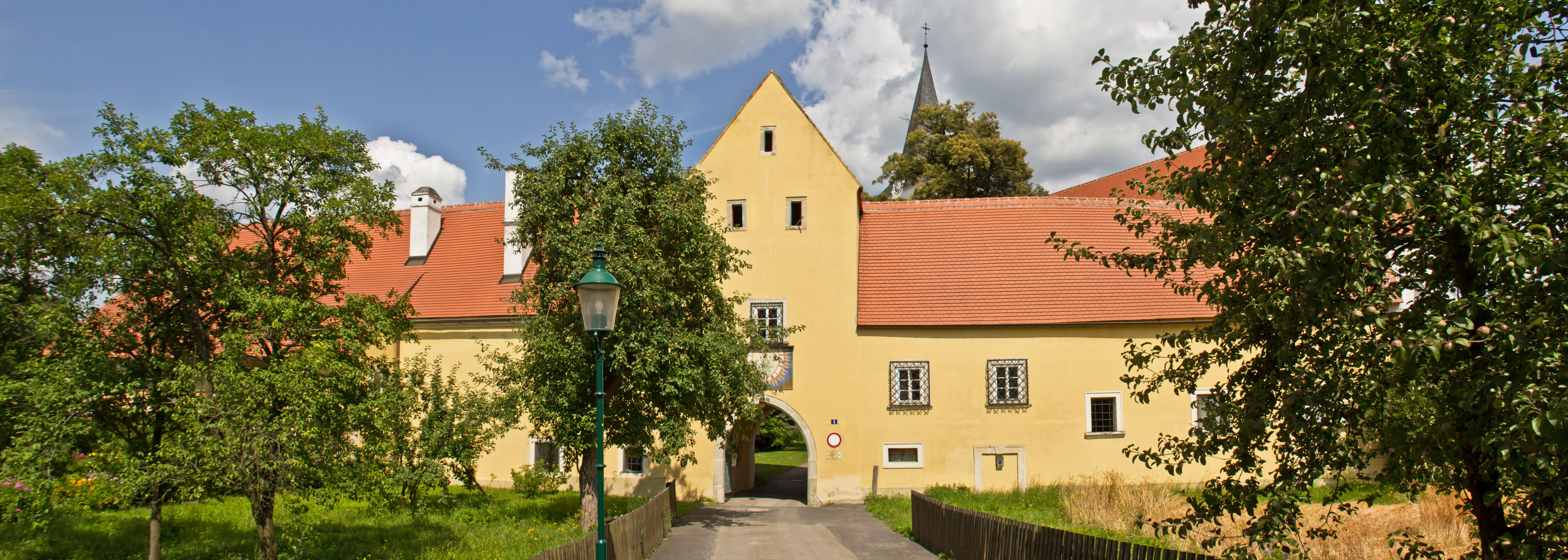
- The former abbey

- Coat of arms

- Location within Austria
- Coordinates: 48°41′N 15°36′E
- Country: Austria
- State: Lower Austria
- District: Horn

Government
  - Mayor: Karl Gabler

Area
  - Total: 29.48 km^{2} (11.38 sq mi)
- Elevation: 328 m (1,076 ft)

Population (2018-01-01)
  - Total: 1,299
  - Density: 44.06/km^{2} (114.1/sq mi)
- Time zone: UTC+1 (CET)
  - Summer (DST): UTC+2 (CEST)
- Postal code: 3580
- Area code: 02982

Sankt Bernhard-Frauenhofen is a town in the district of Horn in Lower Austria in Austria. 21.03% of the municipality are forested. It lies in the Waldviertel area, in the valley of the river Taffa. There are 95 agricultural companies and 67 non-agricultural jobs. 597 persons are employed. The activity rate was 48.17%.

== Subdivisions ==
Sankt Bernhard-Frauenhofen is subdivided into the following Katastralgemeinden:

- Frauenhofen
- Groß Burgstall
- Grünberg
- Poigen
- St. Bernhard
- Strögen

== Population ==
Historical population
Year	Pop.	±%
1971	1,143	—
1981	1,168	+2.2%
1991	1,197	+2.5%
2001	1,289	+7.7%
