= Jacques Grinberg =

Bulgarian painter and printmaker (1941 – 2011)

- Born: Jacques Grinberg; 10 January 1941; Sofia, Bulgaria
- Died: 31 May 2011 (aged 70); Malakoff, France
- Education: Avni Institute of Art and Designin Tel Aviv
- Known for: Painting, Drawing,
- Movement: Abstract expressionism, Neo-expressionism

Jacques Grinberg (Yaacov Grinberg (10 January 1941 – 5 May 2011) was a Neo-expressionist painter and printmaker.

== Biography ==
1941-1960

Jacques Grinberg was born in 1941, in Bulgaria, and lived in Sofia during the war years. His father, Natan Grinberg, a member of the Communist Party in his youth, held a high position in the leadership of Communist Bulgaria after the war. In 1954, the family moved to Israel and settled in Bat Yam. On his arrival, Jacques went to school in a kibbutz, and at a young age began studying art at the Avni School in Tel Aviv.

He probably was not exposed directly to the horrors of the Holocaust, but the subject was not repressed, certainly not by his father, who already in 1945 had published a book of documents attesting to the attempts of the Bulgarian fascist government to eliminate Bulgarian Jewry and to the involvement of the army and the police in the expulsion and extermination of the Jews of Thrace and Macedonia. After the book disappeared from the bookshops in Bulgaria, he published it again in Israel (in Bulgarian).

1961-1970

In 1961, Natan Grinberg published another book in Israel, with a painting by his son on its cover. Jacques’s communistic world view and his acute sensitivity to the events of the time and to man’s fate were an inseparable part of the habitus he grew up in, and are embedded in his work. After showing his works in several exhibitions in Tel Aviv galleries, Jacques moved to Paris in 1962, and in a short time found his place among the first artists who promoted the “New Figuration” orientation, which proposed a contemporary painting that struck out against the abstract, which had taken over everywhere.

Grinberg’s paintings – large in format, bold in their colors – focused on human and animal images, and were highly successful. He was represented by a leading gallery and his paintings were shown in well-regarded exhibitions. But the failure of the Students’ Revolt in 1968 and the collapse of the gallery that represented him (and sold his paintings at a loss, which broke the market for his works) created a new reality for him, and he found it difficult to recover.

1971-1983

Following the closure of the Galerie Schoeller Jacques Grinberg experienced significant financial difficulty and went to live in Israel for a year. His friend, the Israeli poet Meir Wieseltier, chose several of his drawings and lithographs for the covers of his poetic books and for the first issue of Proza 21, an Israeli literary magazine.

On his return to Paris he rented a studio in Saint-Germain-des-Prés. His scope of inspiration widened and he began to include new influences such as the Kabbalah and Tao. His wide-ranging pictorial research became increasingly exploratory.

In 1972, the Galerie de France published, in partnership with the Atelier Clot, and showed lithographs by Jacques Grinberg as well as Pierre Alechinsky, Erró, Asger Jorn, Roberto Matta, Roland Topor and Maurice Wyckaert.

The following year he worked again with Jo Verbrugghen, the Belgian dealer, on a solo exhibition, which was held at the Sint Pietersabdij Museum in Ghent. In 1974, he returned to the Montparnasse neighbourhood, where he had studios in the rue des Plantes and then in rue Campagne Première. At that time Jacques Grinberg's life was particularly hectic and he briefly struggled with psychiatric issues. Supported by his family, he continued to paint. He travelled in Mexico and Greece and brought back numerous ideas and works made in those countries. He also lived and worked for a while in London.

1984-1994

A fresh start in Israel brought about three solo exhibitions, initially at the Dvir Gallery in 1984 and 1985 and then at the 27 Gallery in 1987. Jacques Grinberg's work appealed to an enthusiastic audience and enjoyed widespread media coverage.

In 1987 Grinberg returned to France. He made contact with Cérès Franco, a friend of twenty years' standing who was then director of the Galerie L'Œil-de-Bœuf in Paris. She supported him and organized four solo exhibitions for him between 1988 and 1994.

In 1991 he settled in Malakoff in the Paris suburbs.

1995-2011

During this period, Jacques Grinberg became increasingly reclusive and devoted his time exclusively to his creative work.

His pictorial production was self-assured and intense. He started to write and published several collections. A number of young artists sought him out, and of these several were greatly influenced by his thinking. In 1997, the Galerie Jacques in Ann Arbor (Michigan, USA) exhibited his engravings. In 2002, the Galerie Idées d'artistes organised what would be his last solo exhibition, entitled Véhément, mélancolique. Some of his works are still regularly shown throughout France at public exhibitions of the Cérès Franco collection. In 2008, the Galerie Polad-Hardouin – wishing to pay homage to the New Figuration painters of the 1960s – organised a manifesto exhibition entitled New Figuration: Act III. Jacques Grinberg showed works from this period in the exhibition alongside others including Maryan, Michel Macréau (1935-1995), Paul Rebeyrolle, Antonio Saura, John Christoforou and Bengt Lindström.

Grinberg was independent and passionate about painting, and continued his creative explorations until his death on 31 May 2011.

Jacques Grinberg died in Paris. A bilingual catalogue accompanies the exhibition at the Mishkan Museum of Art (Ein Harod (Meuhad)), in collaboration with The Homme bleu Foundation. In addition to texts by the curators, the catalogue contains an article by the poet Meir Wieseltier. Further exhibitions Of Grinberg's paintings are planned in 2016-2017 in France (Museum of Modern Art City of Paris, collector's donations) and Bulgaria".

== Individual exhibitions ==
- 1963 Galerij Kaleidoskoop, Gand, Belgium
- 1964 Galerie Andre Schoeller Jr Paris, France
- 1965 Galerie Andre Schoeller Jr Paris, France
- 1973 Musee Sint Pietersaldig, Gand, Belgium
- 1984 Dvir Gallery, Tel Aviv, Israel
- 1985 Dvir Gallery, Tel Aviv, Israel
- 1987 Gallery 27, Tel Aviv, Israel
- 1988 Galerie L'Œil de Bœuf, Cérès Franco, Paris, France
- 1990 Galerie L'Œil de Bœuf, Cérès Franco, Paris, France
- 1991 Galerie L'Œil de Bœuf, Cérès Franco, Paris, France
- 1994 Galerie L'Œil de Bœuf, Cérès Franco, Paris, France
- 2002 "Véhément Mélancolique", Galerie Idées d'artistes, Paris, France
- 2012 Exposition rétrospective 1961-2011, Cité internationale des arts in Paris
- 2014 "A la force des pinceaux", Centre culturel Bulgare, Paris, France
- 2015 "Jacques Grinberg - Paintings", Museum of Art Ein Harod, Israel
- 2016 "entre chair et esprit", Maison des Arts de Châtillon, France
- 2016 "Un peintre sans concession", Musée d'Art Moderne de la Ville de Paris, France
- 2016 "Jacques Grinberg, exposition monographique", Galerie La minotaure et Galerie Alain Le Gaillard, Paris, France

== Main group exhibitions ==
- 1959 Katz Gallery, Tel-Aviv, Israel
- 1961 Chemerinsky Art Gallery, Tel-Aviv, Israel
- 1963 "Quatre jeunes peintres israéliens", Galleri 27, Oslo, Norway
- 1963 Galleria Privada, Madrid, Spain
- 1963 "Art graphique juif", Librairie La Proue, Bruxelles, Belgium
- 1963 Peintres israéliens à Paris, Galerie Kaleidoskoop, Gand, Belgium
- 1964 "Moralités", Galeries Lahumiere-Levin, Paris, France
- 1964 "Rencontres", Galerie Krugier, Genève, Switzerland
- 1964 "28 Peintres d'aujourd'hui", Galerie Andre Schoeller, Paris, France
- 1964 Salon de Mai, Musée d’art moderne de la Ville de Paris
- 1964 Salon Grands et Jeunes d’Aujourd’hui, Musée d’art moderne de la Ville de Paris, France
- 1965 Salon de Mai, Musée d’art moderne de la Ville de Paris, France
- 1965 Salon Grands et Jeunes d’Aujourd’hui, Musée d’art moderne de la Ville de Paris, France
- 1965 Salon de la Jeune peinture, Musée d’art moderne de la Ville de Paris, France
- 1966 Esperanto Gallery, New York, United States
- 1966 "Galeries pilotes", Musée de Lausanne, Switzerland
- 1966 Salon Grands et Jeunes d’Aujourd’hui, Musée d’art moderne de la Ville de Paris, France
- 1967 "Figures et histoire", Galerie Heide Hildebrand, Klagenfurt, Austria
- 1968 Moderna Galerija Rijeka, Yugoslavia
- 1969 Galeria Ivan Spence, Ibizza, Spain
- 1969 Galerie Claude Levin, Paris, France
- 1970 Galerie T. Haarlem, Netherlands
- 1973 Galerie de France, Paris, France
- 1991 "Nouvelle figuration version 90", Galerie L'Œil de Bœuf, Paris, France
- 1992 "Petits formats", Galerie L'Œil de Bœuf, Paris, France
- 1993 "l'Anormalita dell'Arte", Refettorio delle stelline, Milan, Italy
- 1996 "Boomerang" Paris, France
- 1997 Galerie Jacques, Ann Arbord, Michigan, USA
- 1999 "Biz'art", Bures sur Yvette, France
- 1999 "L'arte del's 70", Musée d'Art contemporain d'Ibizza, Spain
- 2000 Collection Cérès Franco, Miramas, France
- 2001 "L'art sous pression", Collection Cérès Franco, espace Écureuil, Toulouse France
- 2001 "Entre noirs et blancs", Galerie Idées d'artistes, Paris, France
- 2003 "Désirs Brut", des arts plastiques en Île-de-France, Les Ulis, France
- 2003 "Désirs Brut", Kremlin Bicêtre, France
- 2003 "Entre noirs et blancs", Galerie Idées d'artistes Paris, France
- 2004 "Un art de l'imaginaire débridé", collection Cérès Franco, Grand théâtre d'Angers, France
- 2004-2005 "Fragments d'Artistes", Galerie Idées d'Artistes, Paris, France
- 2005 "Les Imagiers Débridés", Collection Cérès Franco, Carcassonne, France
- 2008 "Nouvelle figuration : Acte III", Galerie Polad-Hardouin, Paris, France
- 2009 "Désirs Bruts", Collection Cérès Franco, Bancaja-Fundacion Caja Castellon, Spain
- 2013 "Den nya figurationen", World art day 15 avril, Härnösand, Sweden
- 2013 "Désirs Bruts", Collection Cérès Franco, Maison des Arts, Châtillon, France
- 2014 "Retour sur quelques artistes de la Nouvelle Figuration", Galerie Polad-Hardouin, Paris, France
- 2015 "En grand format", exposition inaugurale de la Coopérative-Collection Cérès Franco, Montolieu, France
- 2017 Collection Laurent Dumas, Villa Emerige, Paris
- 2016 Perpetuum Mobile, Collection Cérès Franco, Galerie Dominique Polad-Hardouin, Paris

== References and sources ==
Sources

- Benezit Dictionary of Artists, 2006, site Oxford Index (subscription or library membership required)
