= Hasselberg (disambiguation) =

== Placename ==
Hasselberg is a place name notably worn by:

- Hasselberg is a German municipality.

== Family name ==
Hasselberg is a family name of Germanic origin, including:

- Heinz Hasselberg (1914–1989), a German cyclist.
- Per Hasselberg (1850-1894), is a Swedish sculptor.
