= Adam Greenberg =

Adam Greenberg may refer to:

- Adam Greenberg (baseball) (born 1981), Major League Baseball outfielder
- Adam Greenberg (cinematographer) (1937–2025), Israeli-American cinematographer
