= Geras, Austria =

Geras
- Municipality
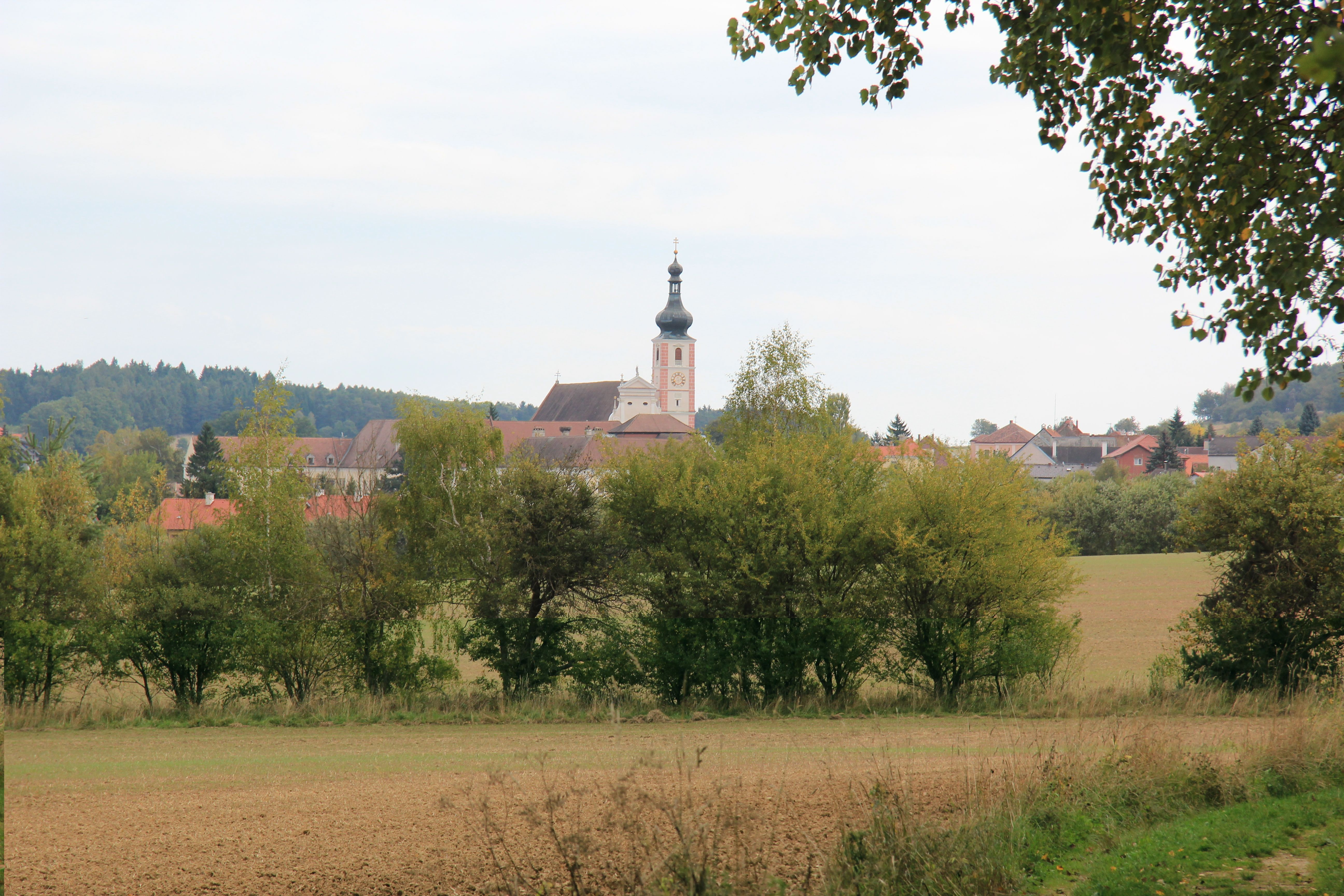
- View of Geras

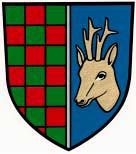
- Coat of arms

- Location within Austria
- Coordinates: 48°48′N 15°40′E
- Country: Austria
- State: Lower Austria
- District: Horn

Government
  - Mayor: Johann Glück

Area
  - Total: 67.66 km^{2} (26.12 sq mi)
- Elevation: 460 m (1,510 ft)

Population (2018-01-01)
  - Total: 1,325
  - Density: 19.58/km^{2} (50.72/sq mi)
- Time zone: UTC+1 (CET)
  - Summer (DST): UTC+2 (CEST)
- Postal code: 2093, 3752, 3753
- Area code: 02912
- Website: www.geras.gv.at

Geras is a town in Lower Austria in the district of Horn in Austria.

== Population ==
Historical population
Year	Pop.	±%
1869	2,442	—
1880	2,420	−0.9%
1890	2,488	+2.8%
1900	2,540	+2.1%
1910	2,622	+3.2%
1923	2,559	−2.4%
1934	2,494	−2.5%
1939	2,399	−3.8%
1951	2,344	−2.3%
1961	1,992	−15.0%
1971	1,808	−9.2%
1981	1,637	−9.5%
1991	1,531	−6.5%
2001	1,433	−6.4%
2011	1,370	−4.4%
