= Pernegg =

- Municipality
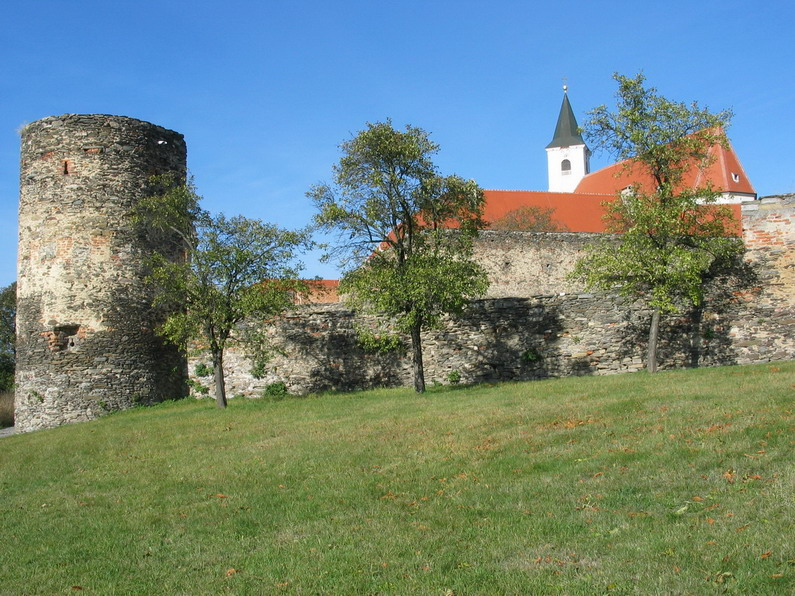
- Pernegg Abbey

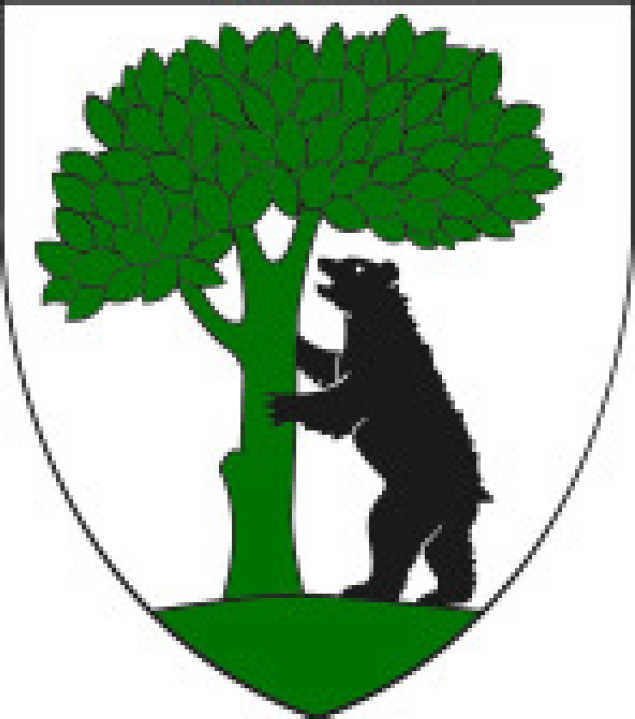
- Coat of arms

- Location within Austria
- Coordinates: 48.7387213°N 15.6290739°E
- Country: Austria
- State: Lower Austria
- District: Horn

Government
  - Mayor: Franz Huber

Area
  - Total: 36.57 km^{2} (14.12 sq mi)
- Elevation: 744 m (2,441 ft)

Population (2018-01-01)
  - Total: 701
  - Density: 19.2/km^{2} (49.6/sq mi)
- Time zone: UTC+1 (CET)
  - Summer (DST): UTC+2 (CEST)
- Postal code: 3753
- Area code: 02913

Pernegg is a town located in the district of Horn in Lower Austria, Austria.

== Population ==
Historical population
Year	Pop.	±%
1923	1,269	—
1951	1,126	−11.3%
1961	997	−11.5%
1971	1,007	+1.0%
1981	818	−18.8%
1991	782	−4.4%
2001	744	−4.9%
2011	703	−5.5%
