= Irnfritz-Messern =

- Municipality
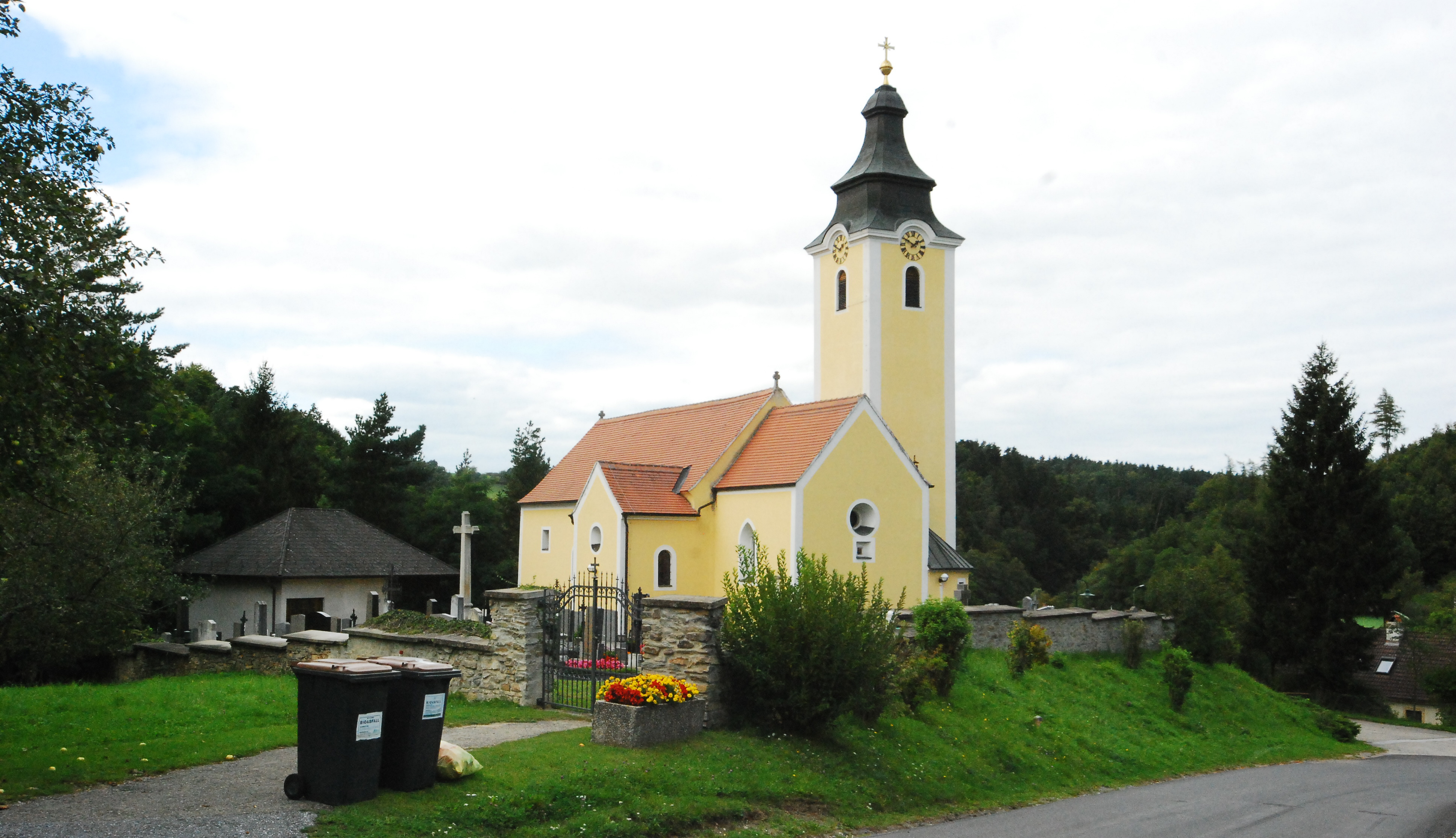
- Messern parish church

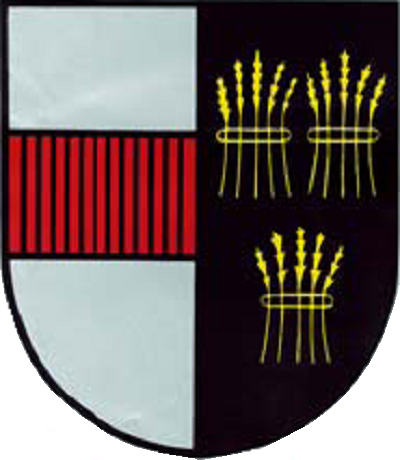
- Coat of arms

- Location within Austria
- Coordinates: 48°44′N 15°33′E
- Country: Austria
- State: Lower Austria
- District: Horn

Government
  - Mayor: Hermann Gruber

Area
  - Total: 55.98 km^{2} (21.61 sq mi)
- Elevation: 561 m (1,841 ft)

Population (2018-01-01)
  - Total: 1,409
  - Density: 25.17/km^{2} (65.19/sq mi)
- Time zone: UTC+1 (CET)
  - Summer (DST): UTC+2 (CEST)
- Postal code: 3754 and 3761
- Area code: 02986
- Website: www.irnfritz.at

Irnfritz-Messern is a town in the district of Horn in Lower Austria, Austria.

== Population ==
Historical population
Year	Pop.	±%
1869	1,793	—
1923	1,925	+7.4%
1951	1,820	−5.5%
1971	1,680	−7.7%
1981	1,547	−7.9%
1991	1,439	−7.0%
2001	1,412	−1.9%
2011		—
1440		—

== Tourism ==
Irnfritz-Messern is perhaps best known for its Eislaufplatz where people come to ice skate during the winter months. It is also home of the Schloss Wildberg.
