= Jennifer Greenburg =

American photographer (born 1977)

- Born: 1977 (age 48–49)
- Occupation: Photographer

Jennifer Greenburg (born 1977) is an American photographer. Greenburg is known in particular for her series Revising History where she uses digital technology to insert herself into historical photographs.

Her work is included in the permanent collections of the Museum of Fine Arts, Houston, and the Museum of Contemporary Photography,
