= Mihai-Lucian Grünberg =

Romanian chess player

Personal information
- Born: April 29, 1976 (age 50) Târgu Cărbunești, Romania

Chess career
- Country: Romania
- Title: International Master (1999)
- Peak rating: 2472 (July 2007)

Mihai-Lucian Grünberg (born April 29, 1976) is a Romanian International Master in chess and the champion of Romania (2003).

He is the son of Sergiu-Henric Grünberg, a former Romanian chess champion. In 2005, Grünberg represented Romania at the Maccabiah Games.
