= Jack J. Grynberg =

Polish-American businessman (1932–2021)

- Born: January 12, 1932; Brest, Poland (now in Belarus)
- Died: October 11, 2021 (aged 89); Denver, Colorado, United States
- Education: Colorado School of Mines
- Occupation: Businessman
- Spouse: Celeste Grynberg (div. 2018)
- Children: 3

Jack J. Grynberg (January 21, 1932 – October 11, 2021) was an American businessman. He was a Denver-based oil and gas developer who amassed a multibillion-dollar fortune in the oil and natural gas sector.

As of 2019, he was in a long-running litigation to regain control of companies he founded from his ex-wife and three children, or failing that, around $400 million in back pay.

== Early life ==
Born to a Jewish family in the Polish city of Brest (now Brest, Belarus), Grynberg was in the second grade when the Nazis invaded Poland. He stated that he joined the resistance and by the age of 12 he was fighting in the forests of Belarus, and fought until 1945. He then moved to Colorado, where he attended the Colorado School of Mines, married, and began raising his three children. He also claimed that he worked as a spy for the US Army in 1957 and 1958.

He had a master's degree in Petroleum Engineering and Refining from the Colorado School of Mines.

== Career ==
=== Early career ===
Grynberg made his first million dollars by the age of 30 when he formed a company, Oceanic Exploration Co., that reworked a previously drilled gas well that had been abandoned by Amerada Hess Corporation as "noncommercial". After reviewing and interpreting data from the area, he concluded that Amerada Hess was wrong. His reworked well led to the discovery of the Nitchie Gulch gas field in Wyoming, leading Grynberg to become a millionaire in 1962. From there he engaged in several successful domestic and international oil and gas exploration programs, and took the Oceanic Exploration public in 1972.

=== Later career ===
Grynberg was also instrumental in the 1990s in helping discover the Kashagan Field in Kazakhstan, one of the largest oil field discoveries in the last 30 years.

The Kashagan Field is estimated to hold 9 billion barrels (1.4×10^{9} m^{3}) of recoverable oil and 25 trillion cubic feet (710 km^{3}) of natural gas. Grynberg was one of the first western oilmen to develop relations with Kazakh President Nursultan Nazarbayev before the collapse of the Soviet Union. This relationship and others provided him with access to complex and confidential data.

According to court records, it was Grynberg who provided the introductions and data for BG, BP, Statoil, ARCO, Transworld Oil and others to enter the region in the late 1980s and early 1990s. When the consortium of major American oil companies fell apart, BG cut its own deal for the Karachagnak gas/condensate field and attempted to exclude Grynberg from the deal. Grynberg sued in Texas, and much of the Texas court case is sealed.

When BP attempted to exclude Grynberg from its 9.5% stake in its Kashagan stake, Grynberg sued them as well in New York including leveling a racketeering charge against then BP CEO John Browne. The case was settled in arbitration.

BP and BG both sold their remaining interests in Kashagan in 2003. BG sold to the Sinopec and BP to CNOOC. The combined sales price is estimated to have been $1.23 billion, of which Grynberg may have received as much as 15% of ($185 million). This is in addition to the $90 million that Grynberg is estimated to have received with BP and Statoil previously sold part of their interests to Total for $600 million in 2001.

Grynberg is known for defending his rights in court. According to one source, during negotiations involving the Kashagan interests, he ripped up a settlement check for $90 million and demanded appraisal and arbitration.

Grynberg reportedly owned more than 800 oil and natural gas wells throughout the world. He was involved in ventures in the former Soviet Union, Middle East, Africa, Far East and Latin America.

Grynberg has been focused on a Qui Tam lawsuit against the major oil companies accusing them of stealing billions of dollars in royalties from the U.S. government.

== Later ventures ==
Since 2006 Grynberg has been working on developing ethanol plants in Latin America and has received leases and agreements throughout Latin America.

In 2006 through 2007, it is reputed that Grynberg entered into discussions with Ivanhoe Energy (IVAN: NASDAQ) to provide services from their heavy oil unit for his leases in the Pungarayacu Tar Sands Heavy Oil Deposit in Ecuador.

According to public court records, Grynberg has argued that after meeting to discuss services and joint venture opportunities, and sharing proprietary geotechnical data, Ivanhoe then circumvented Grynberg and bribed the previous Ecuadorian president, who canceled the Grynberg lease and awarded it to Ivanhoe. The current president of Ecuador has acknowledged the issues at stake. The case is currently open against Ivanhoe and Robert Friedland, Chairman, President and CEO of Ivanhoe.

== Personal life ==
He was married to Celeste until their divorce in 2018, and they had three children together, Rachel, Stephen, and Miriam.

Grynberg died on October 11, 2021, at the age of 89.
