= Peter J. Rentfrow =

American psychologist

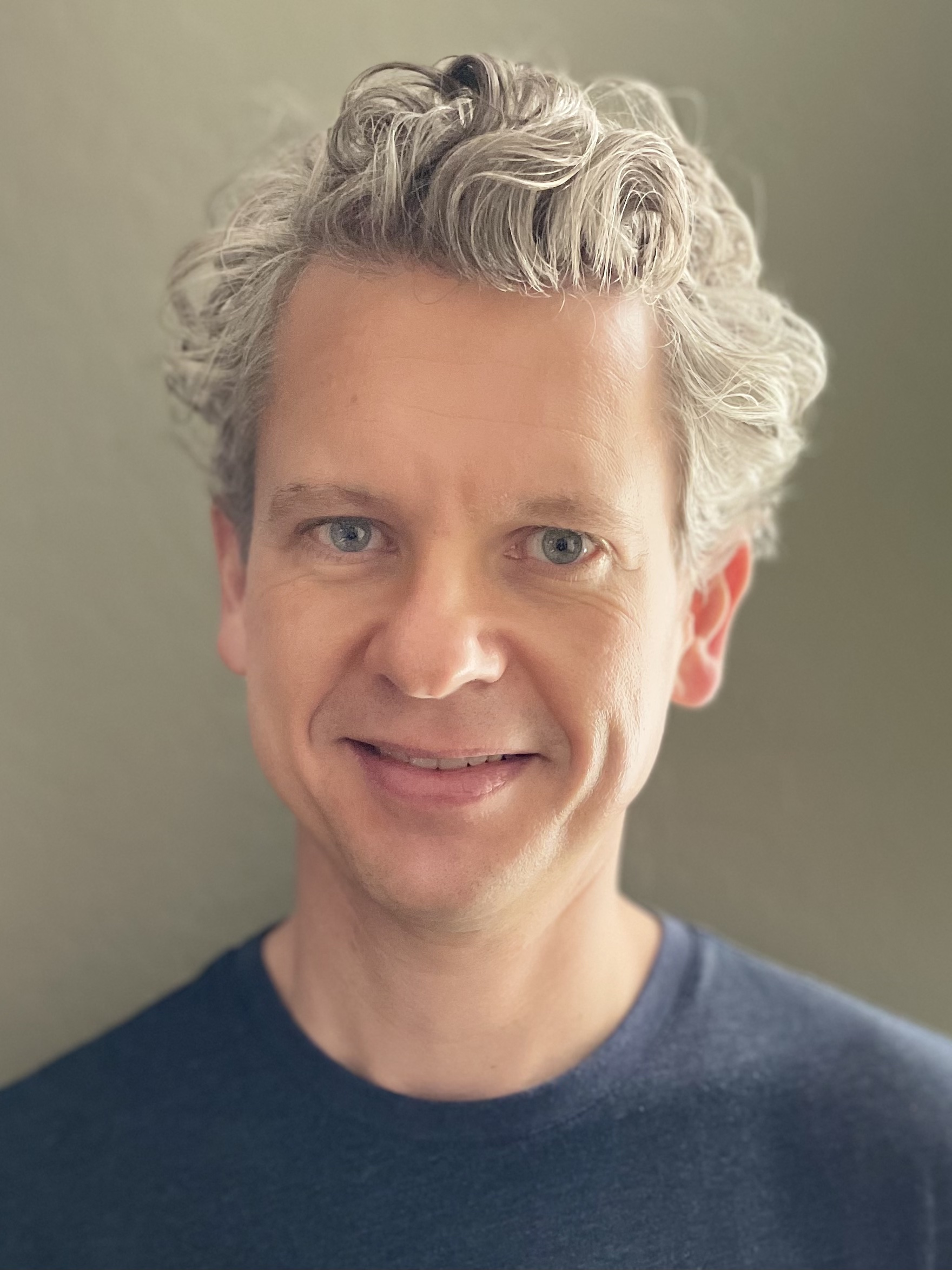
- Born: 4 June 1976
- Alma mater: University of Texas at Austin
- Occupation: Academic, psychologist
- Employer: University of Cambridge

Peter Jason Rentfrow is an American psychologist who is a professor of personality and individual differences in the Psychology Department at Cambridge University.

== Early life and education ==
Rentfrow was born on 4 June 1976. He studied at the University of Texas, first receiving an undergraduate degree in Psychology in 1998 and then a PhD in 2004 under the supervision of Samuel D. Gosling, William B. Swann, and James W. Pennebaker. He moved to the University of Cambridge in 2005.

== Research ==
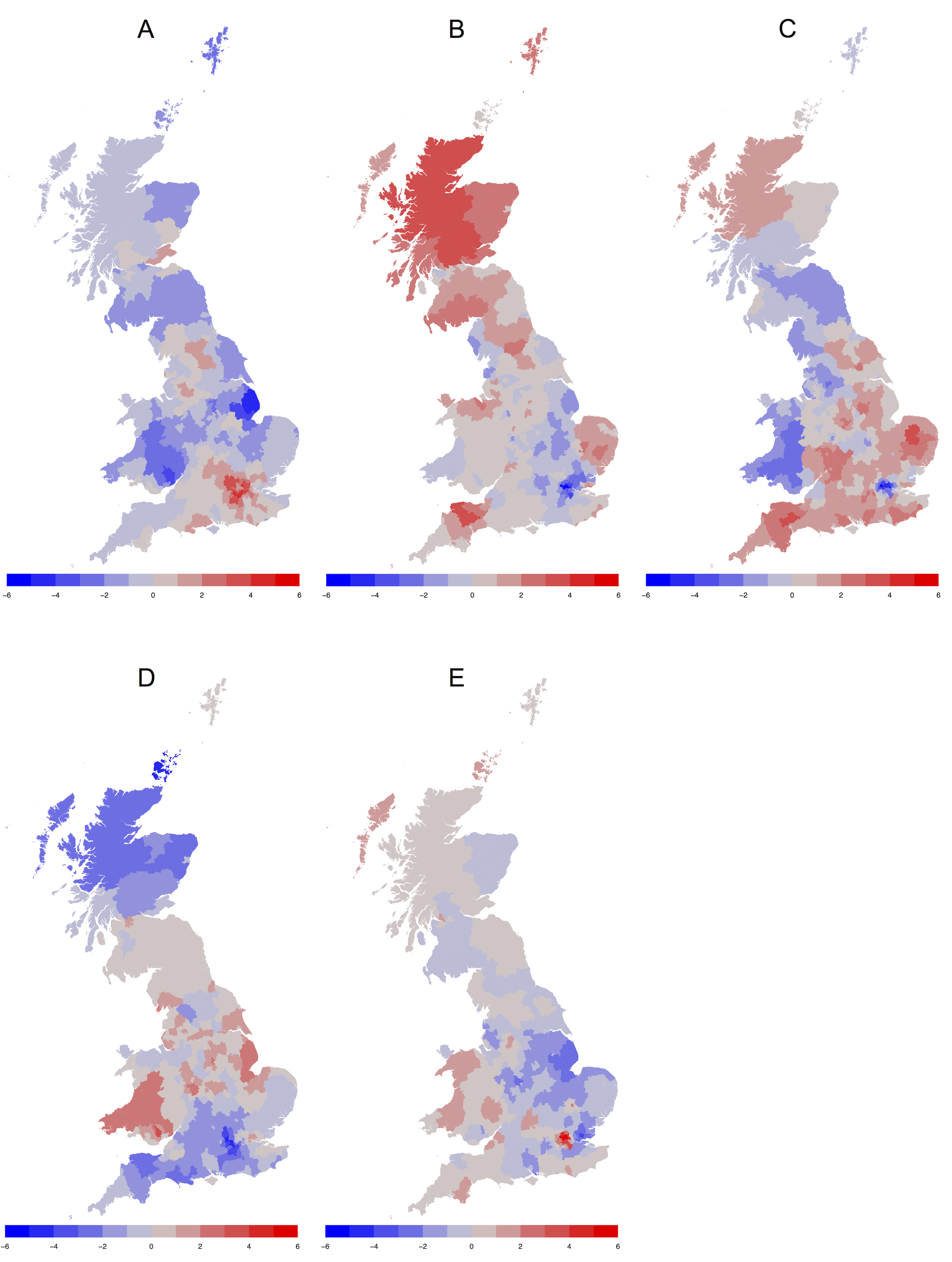
Maps showing differences in (A) Extraversion, (B) Agreeableness, (C) Conscientiousness, (D) Neuroticism, (E) Openness. For each trait, the areas in blue are comparatively low and the areas in red are comparatively high

Rentfrow describes his research as examining "links between basic personality traits and common social psychological processes". He has studied how people's musical preferences and where they live influences their personality.

In 2009 he collaborated with BBC Lab UK to develop an online personality test that was featured in Child of our Time. 400,000 people participated and in 2015, the results were used to develop another test that revealed where people would be happiest living in the UK. In 2016, he worked with the Sutton Trust and Robert de Vries on a report titled A Winning Personality which examined the influence of children's personalities and their family background on future career prospects. "Conscientiousness, self-discipline, efficiency and organisation" were found to be associated with higher incomes and the children of professionals were found to be more extroverted.

Rentfrow has collaborated with computer scientist Cecilia Mascolo to develop smartphone applications that measuring behavior and psychological states unobtrusively.

As of 2020 his publications had been cited 12,000 times and he had an h-index of 40.

== Selected publications ==
=== Books ===
- Rentfrow, Peter J., ed. Geographical Psychology: Exploring the Interaction of Environment and Behavior. Washington, D.C.: American Psychological Association, 2014.
- Rentfrow, Peter J., and Daniel J. Levitin, eds.Foundations in Music Psychology: Theory and Research. 2019. ISBN 9781433815393
