= Charles Greenberg =

American composer

Charles Louis "Charlie" Greenberg is an American composer and arranger of instrumental and vocal arrangements for classical, jazz, contemporary and musical theater productions. His career spans more than 40 years. His compositions have been performed at Off-Broadway venues including the Vineyard Theater, Circle Repertory, Symphony Space, Lincoln Center Summer Festival, Eugene O’Neil Theater Foundation, Westbeth Theater, Stanford Lively Arts, Tribeca Performing Arts, Abrons Performing Arts Center, 42nd Street's Clurman Theater and Mint Theater.

== Career ==
In 1996, Greenberg began a long-time collaboration with librettist and lyricist, Barbara Zinn Krieger. Together, they have staged numerous productions for the New York City Children's Theater, including Little Kit (1997 & 1999) Butterfly (2008 & 2012), Jose Limon: The Making of an Artist (2009), Sky Boys (2011) and Young Charles Dickens, a 2016 nominee for Best Family Show by the Off-Broadway Alliance.

Greenberg has also written incidental music for The Emperor's New Clothes and other Magical Stories, which opened at the Clurman Theater on November 24, 2018.

Greenberg wrote the incidental music for Circle Repertory's premiere of A.R. Gurney's Who Killed Richard Corey (1976) and performed in the production. He also collaborated with Camille Saviola on the 1993 theater lab production of The Chocolate Ambassador at the Vineyard Theater, and was the composer and lyricist for the 1987 staged reading of A Month in the Country, directed by Steve Gomer, also at the Vineyard Theater.

In addition to productions for the New York City Children's Theater, Greenberg also worked with Krieger on Dickens and Nelly (2015), the story of an illicit love affair between British novelist Charles Dickens and actress Ellen "Nelly" Ternan. It was performed as a staged reading at William Patterson University's Playwright Festival.

In the 1980s, Greenberg formed the Hunterdon Hills Playhouse Early Jazz Orchestra, a band which recreated early jazz recordings. The group played Greenberg's transcriptions of music by Jelly Roll Morton's Red Hot Peppers, King Oliver's Original Creole Jazz Band, the Original Memphis Five and the Original Dixieland Jazz Band. The HHP Early Jazz Orchestra was promoted at the Hunterdon Hills Playhouse, the New Jersey Jazz Festival, and on Joe Franklin's radio and television shows.

== Publications ==
Greenberg's "Scenes without Words" for Piano Trio and "Social Distinctions" for Brass Quintet are published through Art of Sound Music.

The 14-track Songs of Male Middle Age-Crazy was released in May 2019 through CDBaby. The CD features original songs, lyrics and instrumentals. It includes performances by pianist Warren Helms, along with 13 singers and instrumentalists.
