= Grünberg (surname) =

Grünberg, Gruenberg is a German surname meaning "green mountain". Variants include Grunberg and in Norwegian Grønnberg.

Notable people with the surname include:

== Grünberg ==
- Alfred Grünberg (1902–1942), Communist member of the resistance against the Nazis
- Carl Grünberg (1861–1940), founder of the Archiv für die Geschichte des Sozialismus und der Arbeiterbewegung (Archive for the history of socialism and workers movement) (1911–1930)
- Karl Grünberg (1891–1972), German Communist writer and journalist
- Grethe Grünberg (born 1988), ice dancer
- Hans Grünberg (1917–1998), German fighter pilot
- Hans-Ulrich Grünberg (born 1956), German chess master
- Karl Grünberg (disambiguation)
- Klaus Grünberg (born 1941), German actor
- Martin Grünberg (1655–1706), architect
- Mihai-Lucian Grünberg (born 1976), Romanian chess master
- Peter Grünberg (1939–2018), German physicist and Nobel Prize winner
- Rosa Grünberg (1878–1960), Swedish actress and soprano
- Sergiu-Henric Grünberg (born 1947), Romanian chess master
- Sven Grünberg (born 1956), Estonian ambient and progressive rock composer
- Theodor Koch-Grünberg (1872–1924), ethnologist

== Grunberg ==
- Arnon Grunberg (born 1971), Dutch writer
- Greg Grunberg (born 1966), American television actor
- Marianne Grunberg-Manago (1921–2013), French biochemist

== Gruenberg ==
- Benjamin Charles Gruenberg (1875–1965), American biology educator
- Elliott Gruenberg (born 1990), American guitarist and lead guitarist for Blessthefall
- Erich Gruenberg (1924–2020), British violinist
- Jean Gruenberg (born 1950), Swiss biologist
- Karl Walter Gruenberg (1928–2007), British mathematician
- Louis Gruenberg (1884–1964), composer
- Martin J. Gruenberg (born 1953), 20th Chairperson of the Federal Deposit Insurance Corporation
- Max Gruenberg (1943–2016), American politician
