= David Aaron Greenberg =

American poet

- Born: David Aaron Greenberg; 1971 (age 54–55); New Haven, Connecticut
- Other name: David Greenberg
- Occupations: Artist, poet, songwriter
- Years active: 1991–present
- Website: www.davidaarongreenberg.com

David Aaron Greenberg (born 1971) is an American artist, singer, songwriter, poet, and essayist based in the New York metropolitan area.

== Early life and education ==
Greenberg attended Rutgers University from 1989 to 1993. In 1990, poet Allen Ginsberg became a mentor to him. Ginsberg would praise Greenberg to William S. Burroughs as "a very intelligent kid." After he graduated Phi Beta Kappa from Rutgers, Greenberg briefly lived in Ginsberg's East Village apartment.

== Career ==
Greenberg's paintings and drawings were first exhibited at Alleged Gallery's original Ludlow Street location in a show curated by Tatiana von Fürstenberg in 1995. Roberta Smith highlighted his "energetic" drawing style in her review of the Na'er Do Wells group show at DNA Studios in 2000. His work has also been exhibited at the National Arts Club.

In 1994, Greenberg founded the New York City indie rock band Pen Pal with poet and drummer Mario Mezzacappa, which would release their album Best Boy on Evil Teen Records in 1996. In 1999 he co-founded Disco Pusher, a New York City-based songwriting and production duo, with producer and composer David Sisko, that has collaborated on projects with artists as varied as Toots Hibbert and Ninjasonik. Greenberg released his first solo album Sending Love in 2020 on the indie label Arena 01.

Soft Skull Press published Feeling Gravity's Pull, a collection of Greenberg's poems. He also collaborated with artist Donald Baechler on 1998's Crowd Paintings (published by Lars Bohman Gallery in Stockholm, Sweden and 2002's 15 Paintings/15 Texts (published by Bernd Kluser Gallery, Munich, Germany). His essay on Patti Smith appeared in Parkett; and his tribute to poet and painter Rene Ricard was published in Art in America More recently, Greenberg explored the metal sculpture work of Bob Dylan in an essay published by WhiteHot Magazine. Greenberg is also the co-author of Strange Messenger: The Work of Patti Smith (with John W. Smith, published in 2003 by the Andy Warhol Museum, ISBN 0-971-56882-0)

In a July 2023 article in Whitehot Magazine, writer Noah Becker said of Greenberg, "Reconsidering ideological and visual givens is a more difficult task than people assume. Greenberg directly tackles this task and reifies and mythifies his subjects, paying homage to the people in his portraits. His process of sifting-down traditional identity and focusing on ethnic specificity, silences pre-conceived notions of what making figurative art should be about."

== Quotes ==
"Ultimately, even if it’s the landscapes that I do, the portraits, they’re all a way to elevate the everyday, every day. People are beautiful." –David Aaron Greenberg, In an interview with The Trops
