= Michał Grynberg =

Polish historian

- Born: 15 October 1909; Sławatycze
- Died: 20 April 2000 (aged 90); Warsaw

Michał Grynberg (1909–2000) was a Polish historian of Jewish origin. A longtime associate of the Jewish Historical Institute in Warsaw, he is known for his work in compiling oral histories of Jewish victims of the Holocaust.

== Works ==
- 2000: Sławatycze, domu mój... O życiu i zagładzie Żydów w Sławatyczach. Losy autora
- 1993: Księga sprawiedliwych
- 1986: Żydowska spółdzielczość pracy w Polsce w latach 1945–1949
- 1984: Żydzi w rejencji ciechanowskiej 1939–1942
