= List of Christian monasteries in Austria =

This is an incomplete list of Christian religious houses in Austria, including those in territory historically Austrian but now in other countries, both for men and for women, whether or not still extant. All those so far listed are Roman Catholic.

== Austria ==
=== A ===
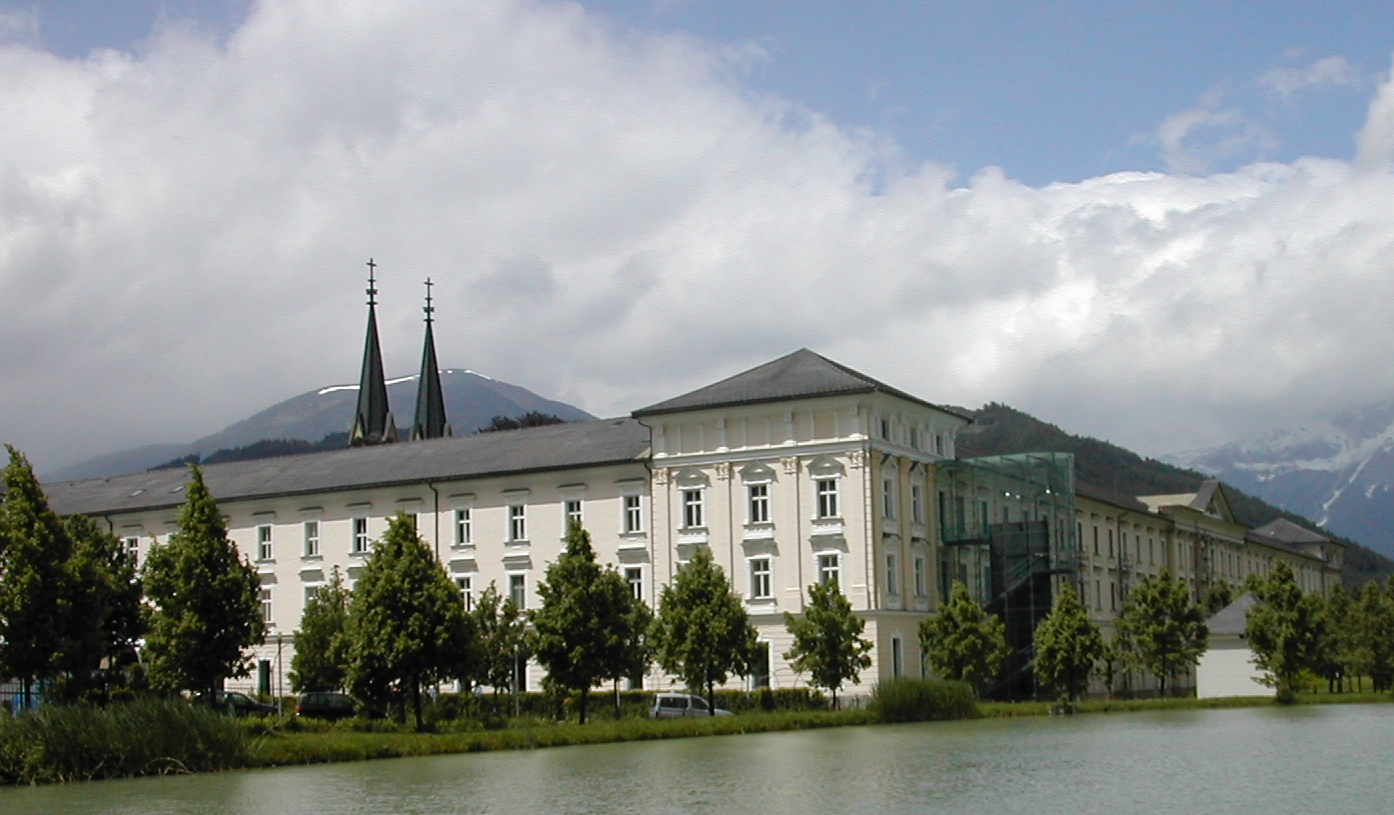
Admont Abbey

- Admont Abbey, Admont (Styria): Benedictine monks (and earlier also nuns)
- Aggsbach Charterhouse (dissolved), Aggsbach (Lower Austria): Carthusians
- Altenburg Abbey, Altenburg (Lower Austria): Benedictine monks
- Altmünster, see Traunkirchen Abbey
- Ardagger Priory (dissolved), Ardagger (Lower Austria): men's collegiate foundation
- Arnoldstein Abbey (dissolved), Arnoldstein (Carinthia): Benedictine monks

=== B ===
- Bad Gleichenberg Friary, Bad Gleichenberg (Styria): Franciscan friars
- Baumgartenberg Abbey (dissolved), Baumgartenberg (Upper Austria): Cistercian monks; now used by the Sisters of the Good Shepherd and Franciscan friars
- Bertholdstein, see St. Gabriel's Priory
- Bludenz (Vorarlberg):
  - Capuchin friary, later Franciscan friary: Capuchin friars until 1991; after then, Franciscan friars
  - St Peter's Priory: Dominican nuns

=== D ===
- Dürnstein Priory (dissolved), Dürnstein in the Wachau (Lower Austria): Augustinian Canons

=== E ===
- St Michael's Friary, Eisenstadt (Burgenland): Franciscan friars
- Engelszell Abbey, Engelhartszell (Upper Austria): Trappist monks, formerly Cistercian monks
- Enns Friary, Enns (Upper Austria): Franciscan friars, formerly Minorites

=== F ===
- Fiecht Abbey, see St. Georgenberg-Fiecht Abbey
- Franciscan friary, Frauenkirchen (Burgenland): Franciscan friars
- Capuchin friary, Freistadt (Upper Austria): Capuchin friars
- Friesach Priory, Friesach (Carinthia): Dominican friars

=== G ===
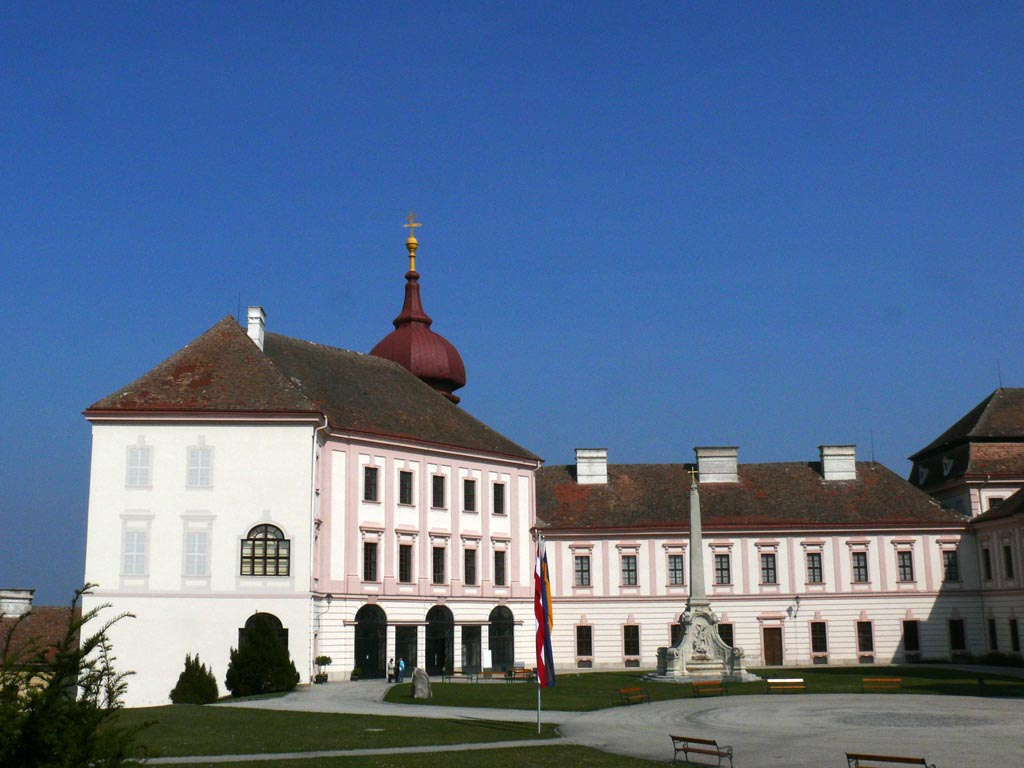
Göttweig Abbey

- Gaming Charterhouse (dissolved), Gaming in Scheibbs (Upper Austria): Carthusians
- Garsten Abbey (dissolved), Garsten (Upper Austria): Benedictine monks
- Geras Abbey, Geras (Lower Austria): Premonstratensian canons
- Gleink Abbey (dissolved), Gleink in Steyr (Upper Austria): Benedictine monks; later Salesian Sisters
- Gloggnitz Priory (later Schloss Gloggnitz), Gloggnitz (Lower Austria): Benedictine monks
- Gmunden Carmel, Gmunden (Upper Austria): Discalced Carmelites
- Göss Abbey (dissolved), Göss in Leoben (Styria): Benedictine nuns
- Göttweig Abbey, Furth (Lower Austria): Benedictine monks
- Graz Friary, Graz (Styria): Franciscan friars
- Gries Abbey, see Muri-Gries Abbey
- Griffen Abbey (dissolved), Griffen (Carinthia): Premonstratensian canons
- Gurk Abbey (dissolved), Gurk (Carinthia): Benedictine monks and nuns
- Güssing (Burgenland):
  - Güssing Abbey: Benedictine monks
  - Franciscan friary, earlier Augustinian Canons
- Gut Aich Priory, Sankt Gilgen (Salzburg): Benedictine monks

=== H ===
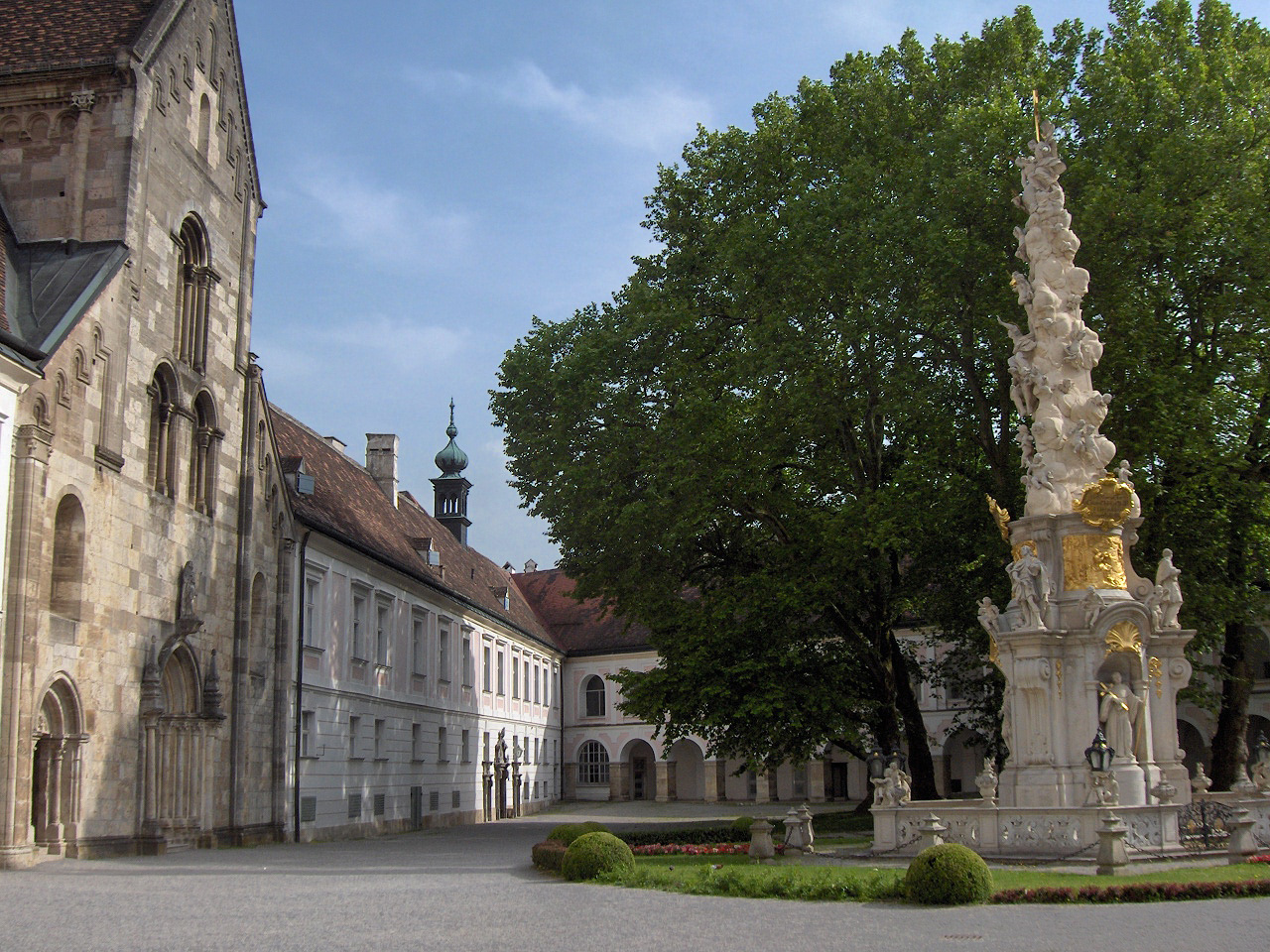
Heiligenkreuz Abbey

- Hall in Tirol (Tyrol):
  - Hall Abbey (dissolved): women's collegiate foundation (Damenstift)
  - Franciscan friary
  - Poor Clares (dissolved)
- Hallein Priory, Hallein (Salzburg): Augustinian Canons
- Hamberg College (dissolved), (Note: situated very close to the border with Germany, and now used as student accommodation for the University of Passau) Schardenberg (Upper Austria): Salvatorian brothers
- Heiligenkreuz Abbey, Heiligenkreuz (Lower Austria): Cistercian monks
- Herzogenburg Priory, Herzogenburg (formerly at St. Georgen an der Traisen, Traismauer) (Lower Austria): Augustinian Canons
- Hohenfurt, see Rein Abbey

=== I ===
- Capuchin friary, Imst (Tyrol): Capuchin friars
- Innsbruck (Tyrol):
  - Carmel of St Joseph and St Teresa: Carmelite nuns
  - Innsbruck Friary: Franciscan friars
  - Redemptorist College: Redemptorist Fathers
  - Servite convent: Servite friars or nuns

=== K ===
- Kahlenberg Hermitage (dissolved), Josefsdorf, Döbling (Vienna): Camaldolese hermits (Note: the former Camaldolese church, now the St. Josefskirche, remains)
- Klein-Mariazell Abbey (dissolved), Kleinmariazell, Altenmarkt an der Triesting (Lower Austria): Benedictine monks
- Klostermarienberg Abbey or Marienberg Abbey (dissolved), Mannersdorf an der Rabnitz (Burgenland): Cistercian monks
- Klosterneuburg Priory, Klosterneuburg (Lower Austria): Augustinian Canons
- Krems (Lower Austria): Piarist Fathers
- Kremsmünster Abbey, Kremsmünster (Upper Austria): Benedictine monks

=== L ===
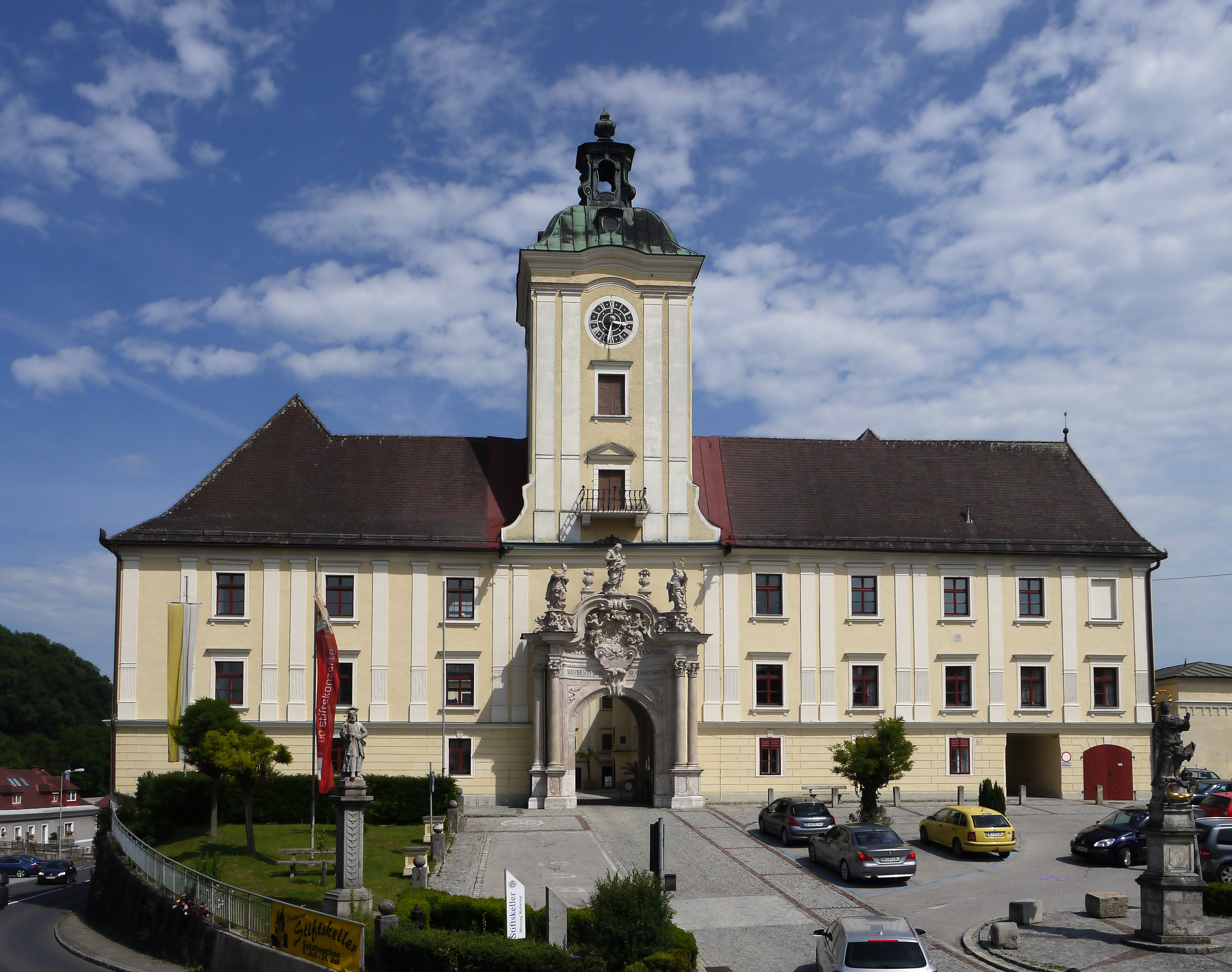
Lambach Abbey

- Lambach Abbey, Lambach (Upper Austria): Benedictine monks
- Leibnitz Friary, Leibnitz (Styria): Capuchin friars
- Redemptorist College, Leoben, Leoben (Styria): Redemptorist Fathers
- Lienz Friary, Lienz (Tyrol): Carmelite friars until 1785, thereafter Franciscan friars
- Lilienfeld Abbey, Lilienfeld (Lower Austria): Cistercian monks

=== M ===
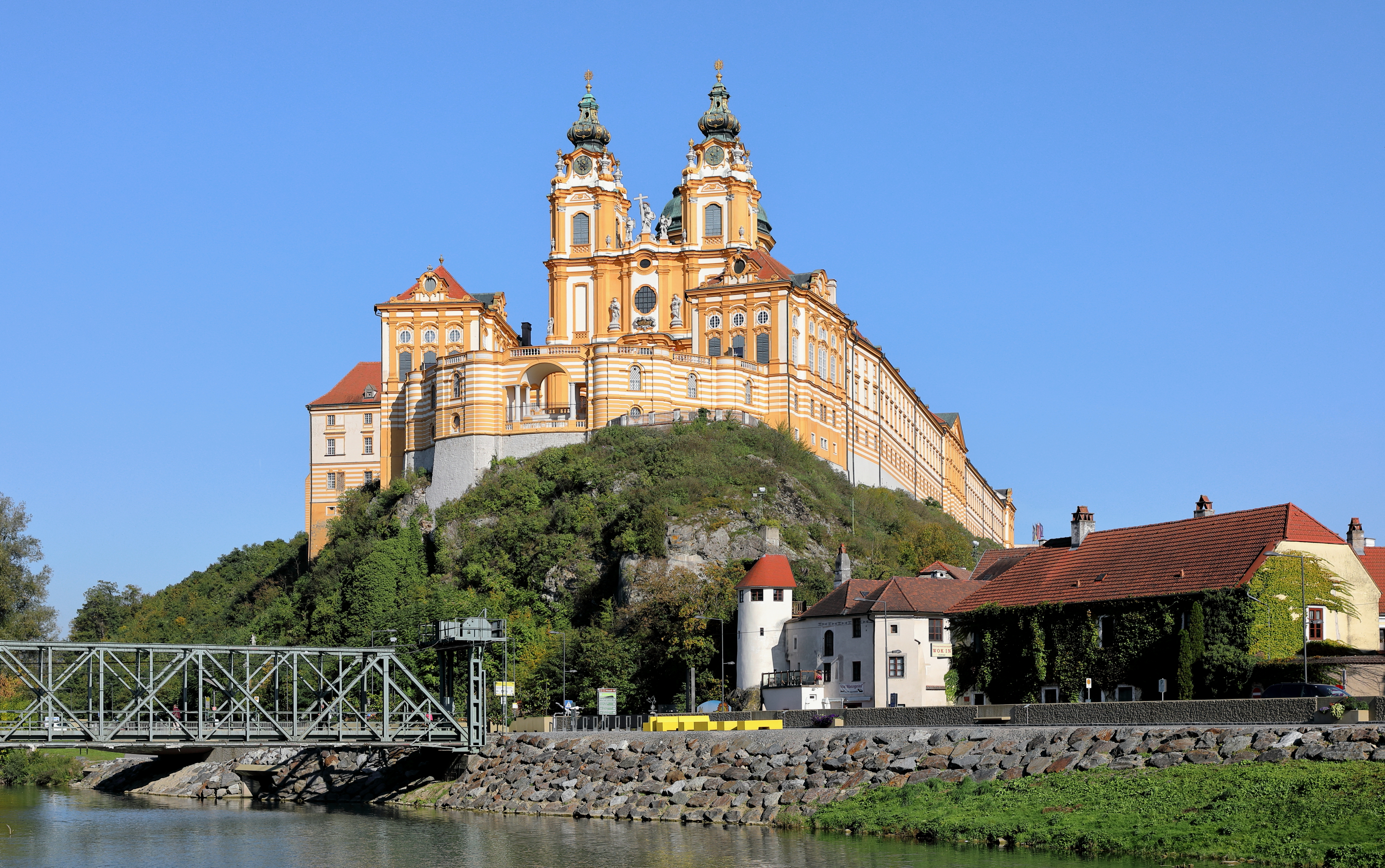
Melk Abbey

- Maria Enzersdorf (Lower Austria):
  - Franciscan friary
  - Poor Clares
  - St. Gabriel's Mission House: Missionaries of the Divine Word (Note: aka Steyler Missionaries) (monks)
- Servite priory, Maria Langegg (Lower Austria): Servites; later occupied by the Englische Fräulein, and most recently by the Community of the Beatitudes
- Maria Luggau in Maria Luggau/Lesach Valley (Carinthia): Servite friars
- Maria Plain, see Salzburg
- Maria Roggendorf, see (1) Marienfeld Priory and (2) St. Joseph's Priory
- Mariastern Abbey, Gwiggen, Hohenweiler (Vorarlberg): Cistercian nuns
- Maria Waldrast near Matrei am Brenner (Tyrol): Servite friars
- Marienberg Abbey, see Klostermarienberg
- Marienfeld Priory, Marienfeld near Hollabrunn (Lower Austria): Cistercian nuns
- Marienkron Abbey, Mönchhof (Burgenland): Cistercian nuns
- Mattighofen (Upper Austria): collegiate foundation, later Mattighofen Provostry
- Mattsee Priory, Mattsee (Salzburg): secular canons, formerly Benedictine monks
- Mauerbach Charterhouse (dissolved), Mauerbach (Lower Austria): Carthusians
- Mehrerau Abbey, see Wettingen-Mehrerau Abbey
- Melk Abbey, Melk (Lower Austria): Benedictine monks
- Mekhitarist Monastery, Vienna: Armenian Catholic monastery of Mekhitarist Congregation
- Michaelbeuern Abbey, Dorfbeuern (Salzburg): Benedictine monks
- Millstatt Abbey (dissolved), Millstatt (Carinthia): Benedictine monks; Knights of the Order of St. George; Jesuits
- Mondsee Abbey (dissolved), Mondsee (Upper Austria): Benedictine monks
- Münzbach Priory, Münzbach (Upper Austria): Dominican friars

=== N ===
- Neuberg Abbey (dissolved), Neuberg an der Mürz (Styria): Cistercian monks
- Neukloster Abbey, now Neukloster Priory, Wiener Neustadt (Lower Austria): Cistercian monks
- Nonnberg Abbey, see Salzburg

=== O ===
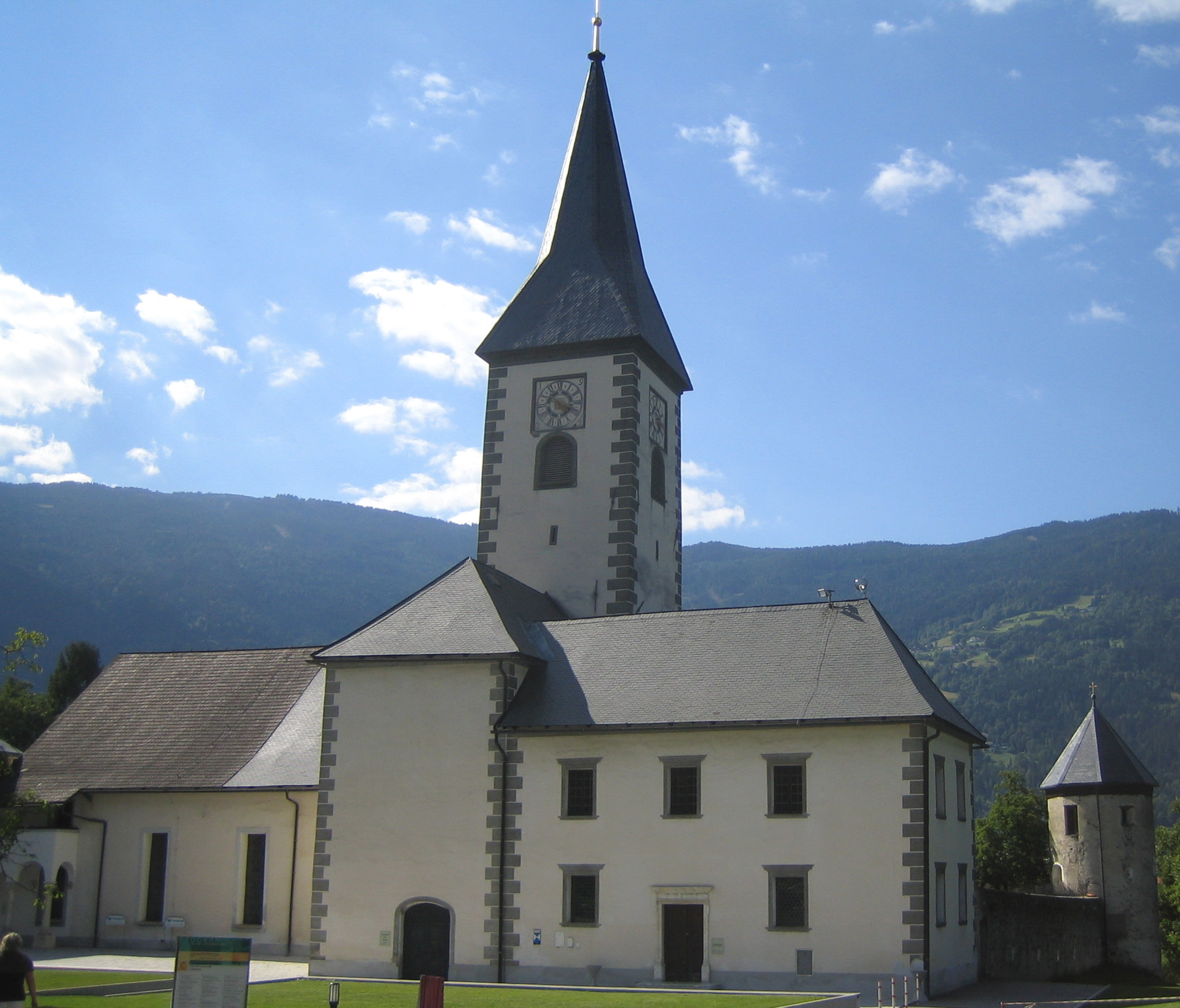
Ossiach Abbey

- Ossiach Abbey (dissolved), Ossiach (Carinthia): Benedictine monks

=== P ===
- Pernegg Abbey (dissolved), Pernegg (Lower Austria): Premonstratensian canonesses to 1584, thereafter Premonstratensian canons
- Pöllau Priory (dissolved), (Note: now known as Schloss Pöllau) Pöllau (Styria): Augustinian Canons
- Pulgarn Abbey, Pulgarn (Upper Austria): Order of the Holy Ghost
- Pupping Friary, Pupping (Upper Austria): Franciscan friars

=== R ===
- Ranshofen Priory (dissolved),Ranshofen (Upper Austria): Augustinian Canons
- Rattenberg Priory (dissolved), Rattenberg (Tyrol): Augustinian Hermits
- Reichersberg Priory, Reichersberg (Upper Austria): Augustinian Canons
- Rein Abbey, known 1950-90 as Rein-Hohenfurt Abbey, Rein in Eisbach (Styria): Cistercian monks
- Reutte Friary, Reutte (Tyrol): Franciscan friars
- Riederberg Friary (Sancta Maria in Paradyso) (dissolved), Ried am Riederberg near Sieghartskirchen (Upper Austria): Franciscan friars (Observants)

=== S ===
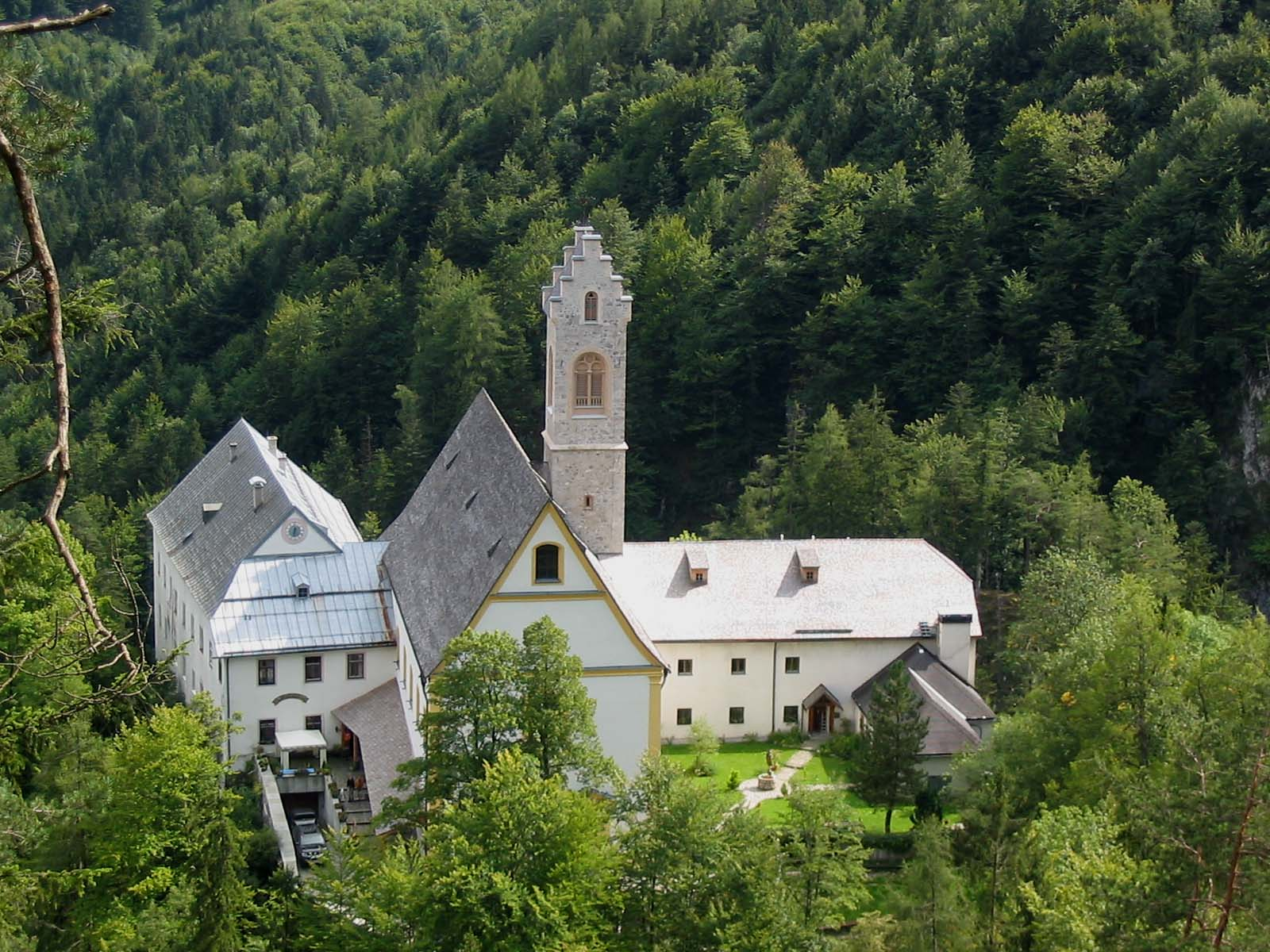
St Georgenberg-Fiecht Abbey

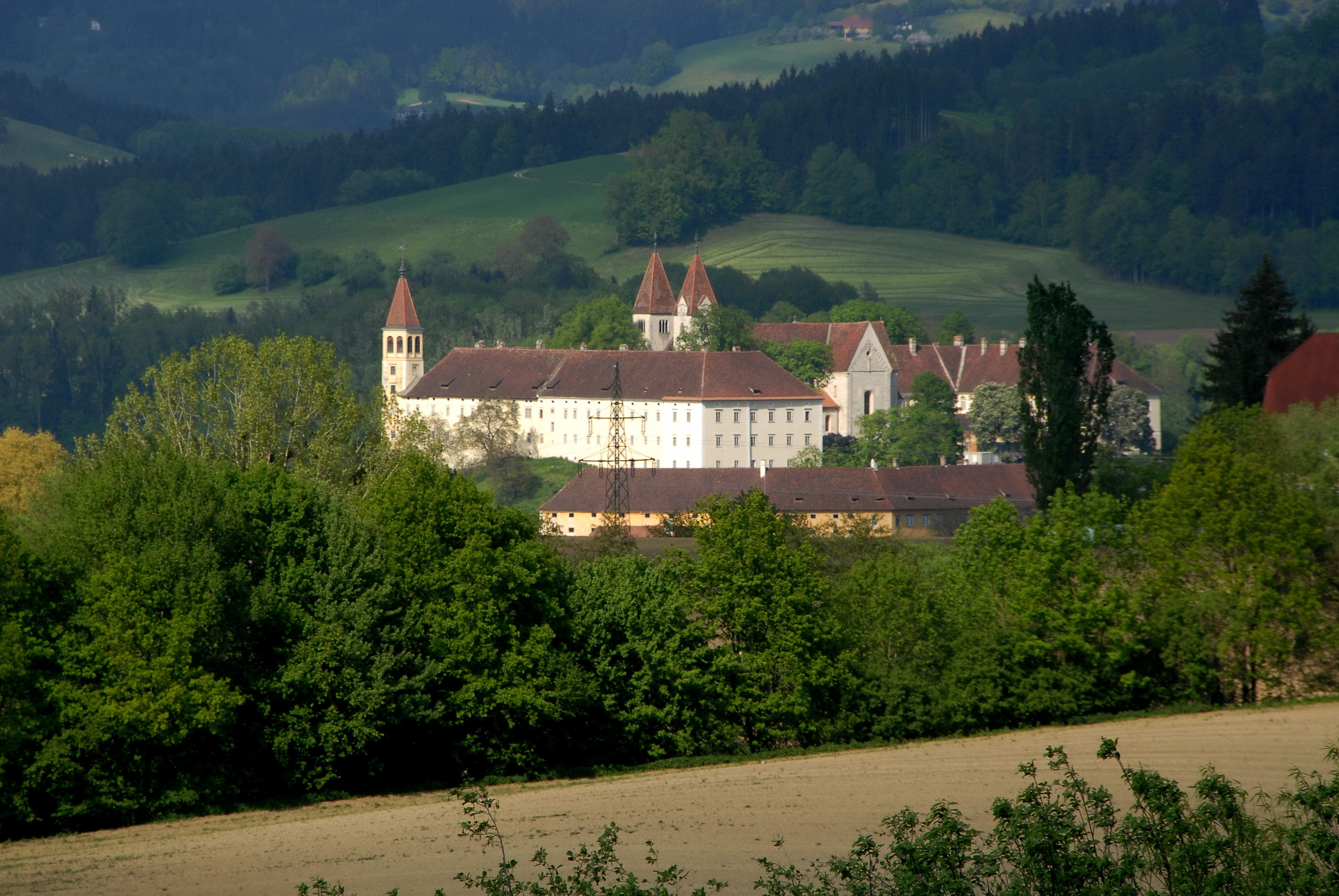
St. Paul's Abbey in the Lavanttal

- St. Antony's Friary in the Pinzgau, see Salzburg
- St. Bernhard's Abbey (dissolved), Sankt Bernhard-Frauenhofen (Lower Austria): Cistercian nuns, later Jesuits
- St. Florian Monastery, Sankt Florian (Upper Austria): Augustinian Canons
- St. Gabriel's Priory, Sankt Johann bei Herberstein (Styria), previously St. Gabriel's Abbey, Schloss Bertholdstein, Pertlstein in Fehring, Styria: Benedictine nuns
- St. George's Abbey on the Längsee (dissolved), Sankt Georgen am Längsee (Carinthia): Benedictine nuns
- St. Georgen an der Traisen, Traismauer: see Herzogenburg Abbey
- St. Georgenberg-Fiecht Abbey, Fiecht in Vomp (Tyrol): Benedictine monks
- St. Joseph's Priory, Maria Roggendorf in Hollabrunn (Lower Austria): Benedictine monks
- St. Koloman's Friary, Stockerau (Lower Austria): Steyler Mission Sisters, formerly Franciscans
- Saint Lambert's Abbey, Sankt Lambrecht (Styria): Benedictine monks
- Sancta Maria in Paradyso, see Riederberg
- St. Paul's Abbey in the Lavanttal, Sankt Paul im Lavanttal (Carinthia): Benedictine monks
- St. Peter's Archabbey, see Salzburg
- St. Peter's Priory, Bludenz (Vorarlberg): Augustinian nuns, later Dominican Sisters
- St. Pölten Abbey (dissolved), Sankt Pölten (Lower Austria): Augustinian Canons; formerly Benedictine monks
- Salzburg:
  - Nonnberg Abbey: Benedictine nuns
  - St. Antony's Friary in the Pinzgau (dissolved), Hundsdorf in Bruck an der Glocknerstraße: Franciscan friars
  - St. Peter's Archabbey, Salzburg: Benedictine monks
  - Franciscan friary, Salzburg
  - Capuchin friary, Salzburg
  - Pallottine friary, Salzburg

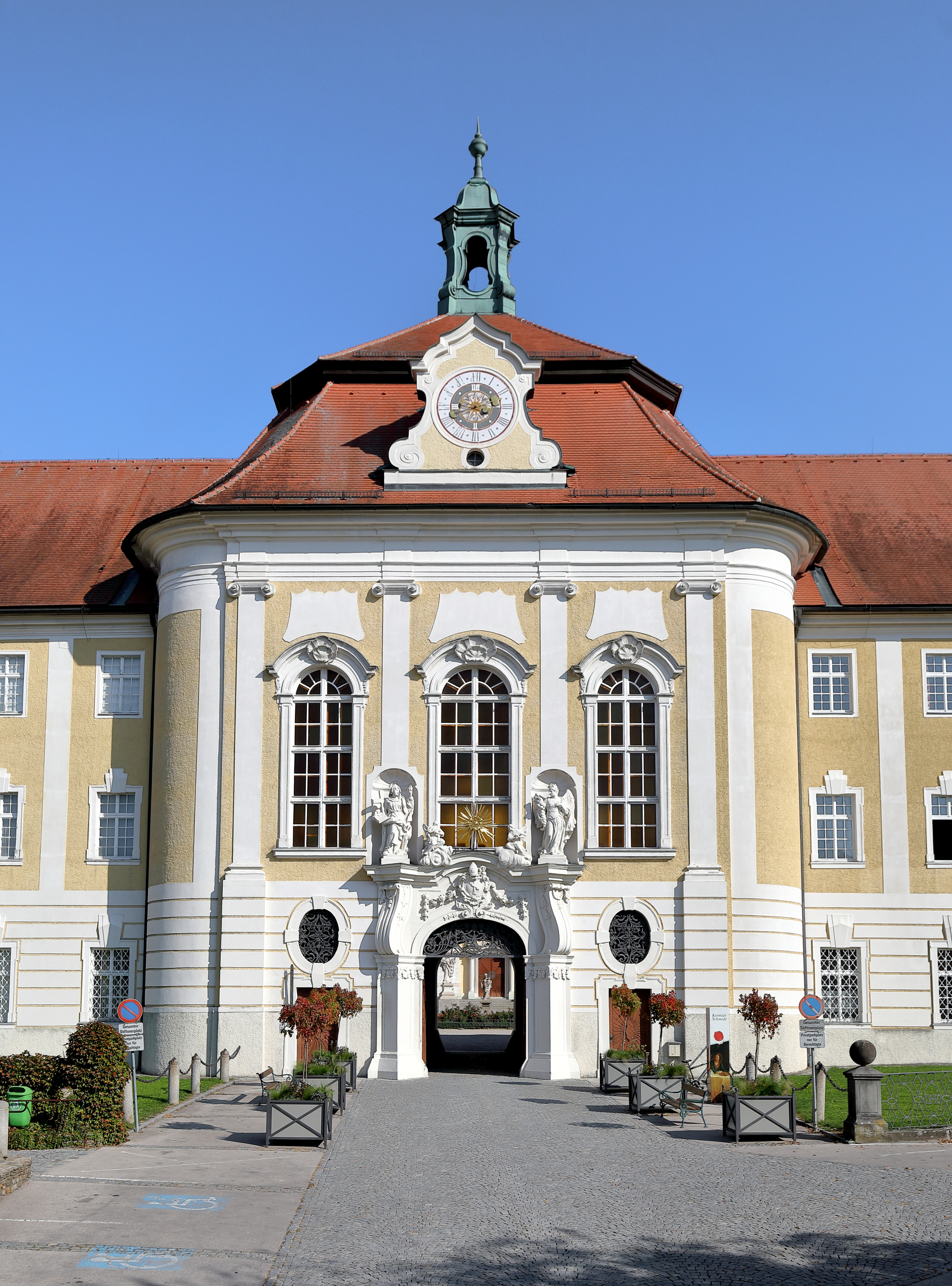
Seitenstetten Abbey

- Säusenstein Abbey (dissolved), Säusenstein (Lower Austria): Cistercian monks
- Schlägl Abbey, Schlägl (Upper Austria): Premonstratensian canons
- Schlierbach Abbey, Schlierbach (Upper Austria): Cistercian monks
- Schönbühel Friary, Schönbühel-Aggsbach (Lower Austria): Servite friars (vacant since 1980)
- Schwaz Friary, Schwaz (Tyrol): Franciscan friars
- Seckau Abbey, Seckau (Styria): Benedictine monks; formerly Augustinian Canons
- Seitenstetten Abbey, Seitenstetten (Lower Austria): Benedictine monks
- Spital am Pyhrn Priory (dissolved), Spital am Pyhrn (Upper Austria): hospital run by a community of lay brothers; later a collegiate foundation, afterwards a priory
- Stainz Priory (dissolved), Stainz (Styria): Augustinian Canons
- Stams Abbey, Stams (Tyrol): Cistercian monks
- Suben Priory (dissolved), Suben (Upper Austria): Augustinian Canons

=== T ===
- Telfs Friary, Telfs (Tyrol): Franciscan friars
- Thalbach Convent, Bregenz (Vorarlberg): Thalbach, since 1983 home to The Spiritual Family "The Work," was originally established in 1436 as a tertiary Franciscan women's monastery, and disbanded by Emperor Joseph II in 1782; it was acquired by Dominican women of Hirschberg-Hirschtal / Kennelbach in 1796.
- Traunkirchen Abbey (dissolved), Traunkirchen (Upper Austria): (Note: a re-foundation of an earlier Benedictine monastery, Traunsee Abbey, nearby but not on the same site, possibly located at Altmünster) Benedictine nuns
- Traunsee Abbey, see Traunkirchen Abbey

=== V ===
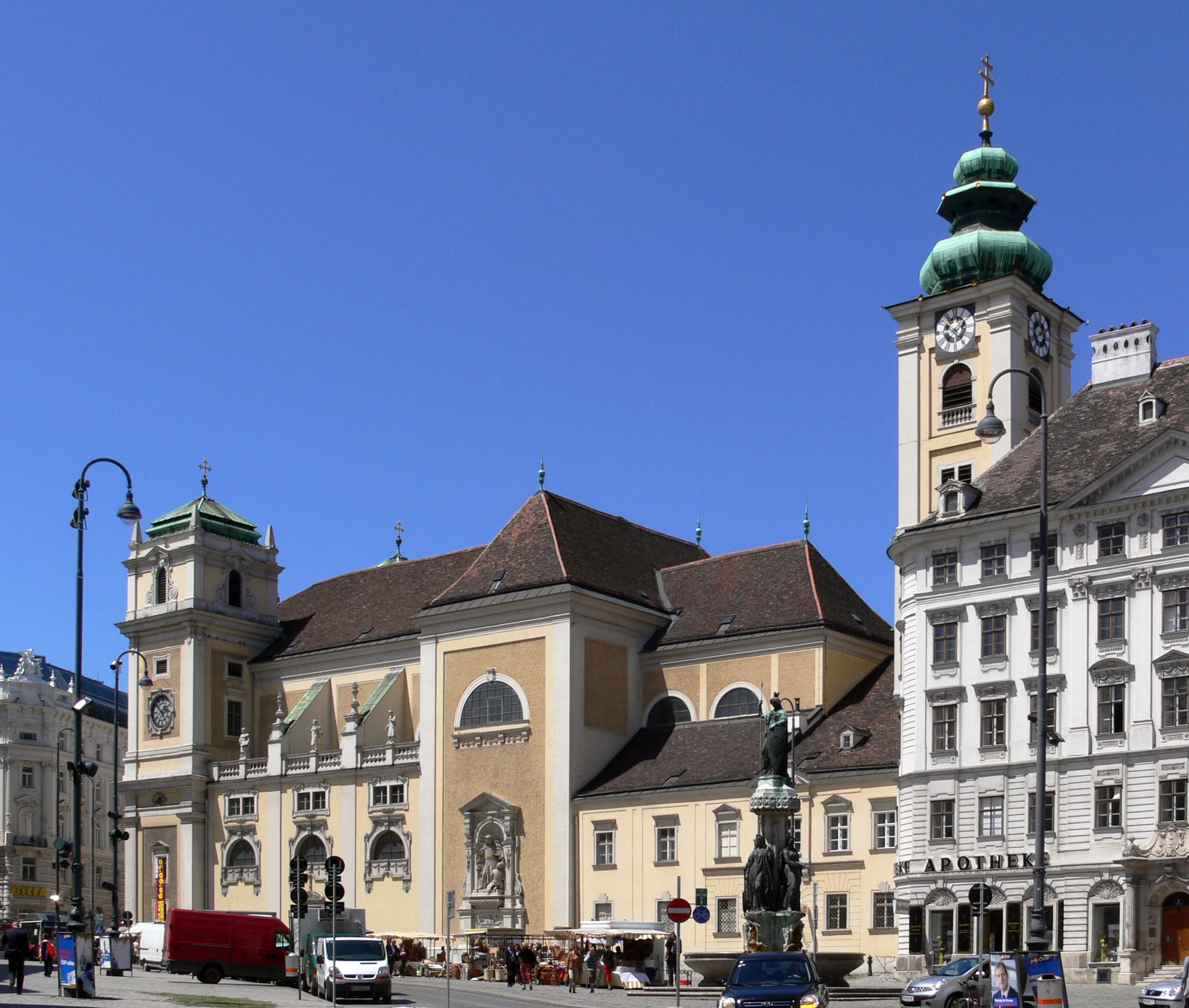
Vienna, Schottenstift

- Vienna:
  - Augustinian friary with the Augustinerkirche (Austin Friars)
  - Capuchin friary with the Kapuzinergruft and Kapuzinerkirche
  - Schottenstift on the Freyung, Vienna: Benedictine monks
- Villach Friary at Villach (Carinthia): Franciscan friars
- Viktring Abbey (dissolved) at Viktring (Carinthia): Cistercian monks
- Volders Priory at Volders near Innsbruck (Tyrol): Servite friars
- Vorau Priory at Vorau (Styria): Augustinian Canons

=== W ===
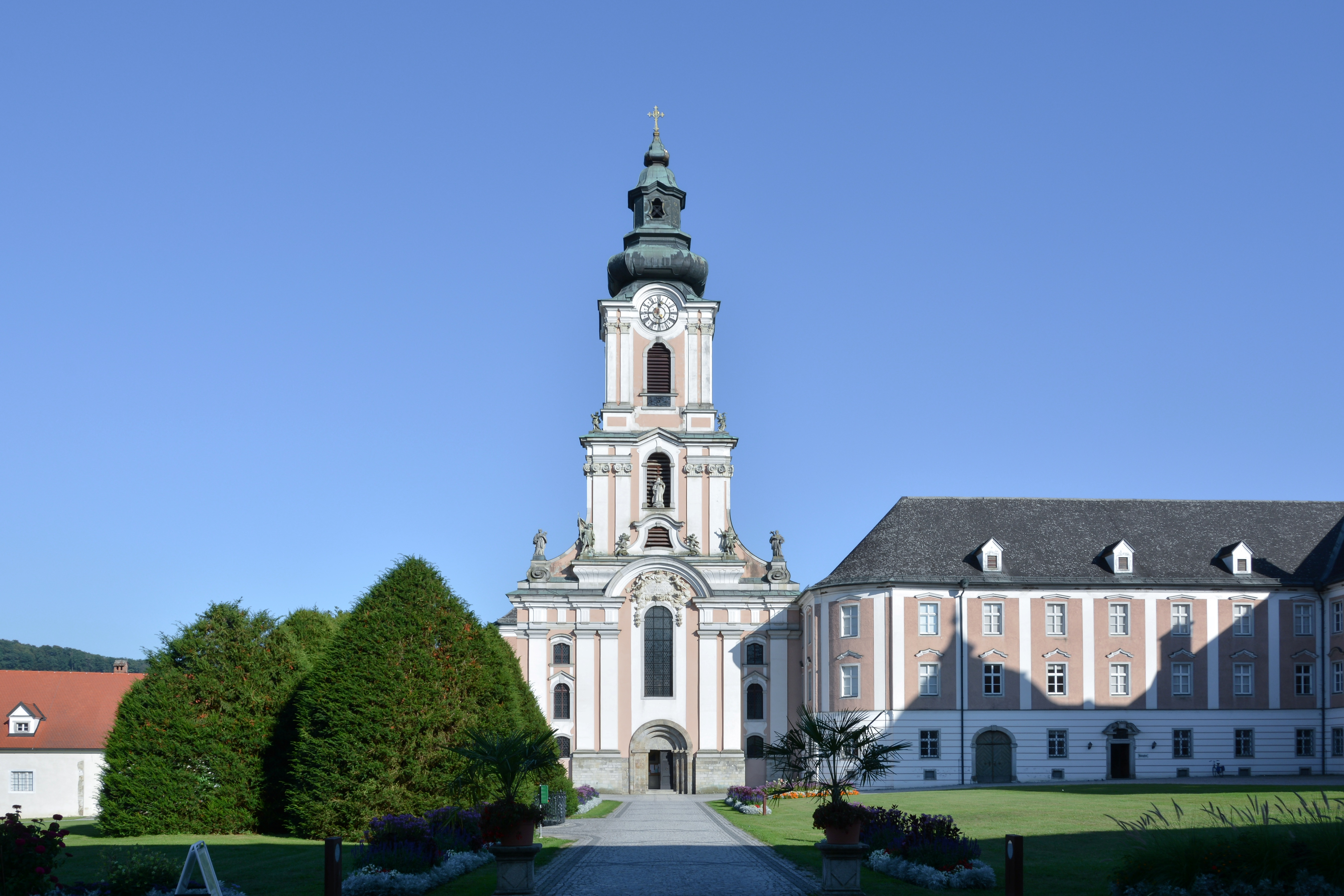
Wilhering Abbey

- Waldhausen Priory (dissolved) at Waldhausen im Strudengau (Upper Austria): Augustinian Canons
- Wernberg Convent in Schloss Wernberg, Wernberg (Carinthia): Mission Sisters of the Precious Blood
- Wettingen-Mehrerau Abbey at Bregenz (Vorarlberg): (Note: Mehrerau Abbey was a Benedictine monastery dissolved when this part of Austria was transferred to Bavaria in 1806; after the territory had been returned to Austria, the empty premises were re-settled in 1854 by the Cistercian community of Wettingen Abbey in Switzerland, who had been expelled from their original home by the government of the Canton of Aargau in 1841) Cistercian monks; formerly Benedictine monks
- Wilhering Abbey at Wilhering (Upper Austria): Cistercian monks
- Wilten Abbey at Wilten in Innsbruck (Tyrol): Premonstratensian canons
- Windhaag Convent, Windhaag bei Perg (Upper Austria): Dominican nuns

=== Z ===
- Zwettl Abbey at Zwettl (Lower Austria): Cistercian monks

== Formerly in Austria ==
=== South Tyrol, Italy ===
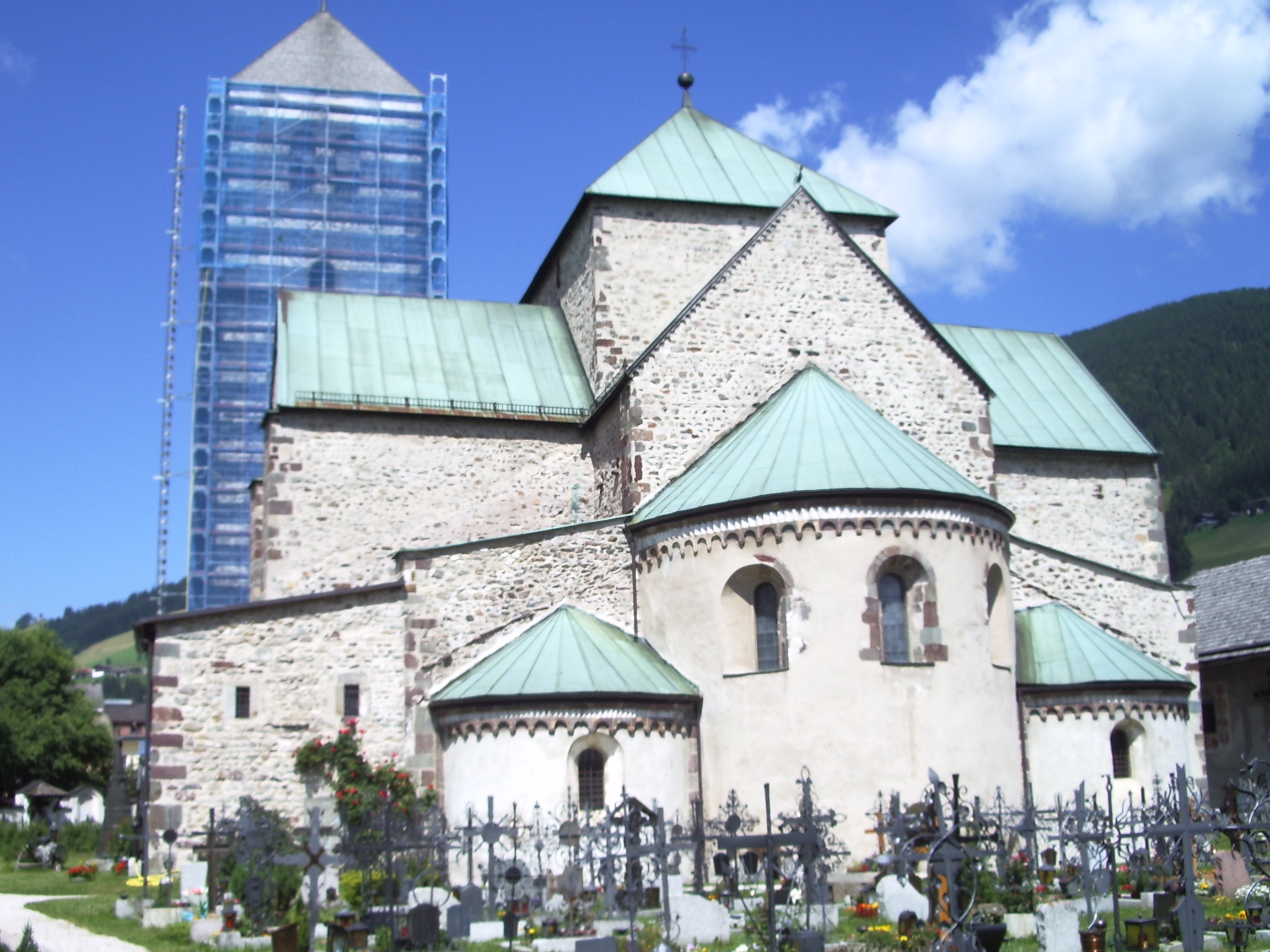
Innichen Abbey

This area became part of Italy after the end of World War I. (Note: occupied in 1918, formally annexed in 1920)

- Franciscan Friary, Bolzano, in Bolzano (Bozen): Franciscans
- Brixen:
  - St. Elizabeth's Priory, Brixen: Poor Clares
  - Brixen Friary: Franciscan friars
- Innichen:
  - Innichen Abbey: Benedictine monks to 1141; thereafter men's collegiate foundation (Herrenstift)
  - Innichen Friary: Franciscan friars
- Kaltern Friary in Kaltern: Franciscans
- Marienberg Abbey at Burgeis: Benedictine monks
- Muri-Gries Abbey at Gries-Quirein, Bolzano: (Note: the community was expelled by the government of the Canton of Aargau from its original home at Muri Abbey in Switzerland in 1841, and re-settled in 1845 at the deserted monastery in Gries, then in Austria) Benedictine monks; formerly Augustinian Canons, then a men's collegiate foundation (Herrenstift)
- Neustift Priory or Abbey at Neustift bei Brixen, Vahrn: Augustinian Canons
- Säben Abbey at Klausen: Benedictine nuns
