= Klocker =

Klocker is a surname. Notable people with the surname include:

- Dieter Klöcker (1936–2011), German clarinetist
- Edit Klocker (born 1979), Hungarian swimmer
- Hans Klocker (before 1474–after 1500), sculptor
- Wolfgang Klocker (born 1971), Austrian ski mountaineer
- Albert Klöcker (1862–1923), Danish mycologist
