= Kaltern Friary =

- Franziskanerkloster Kaltern
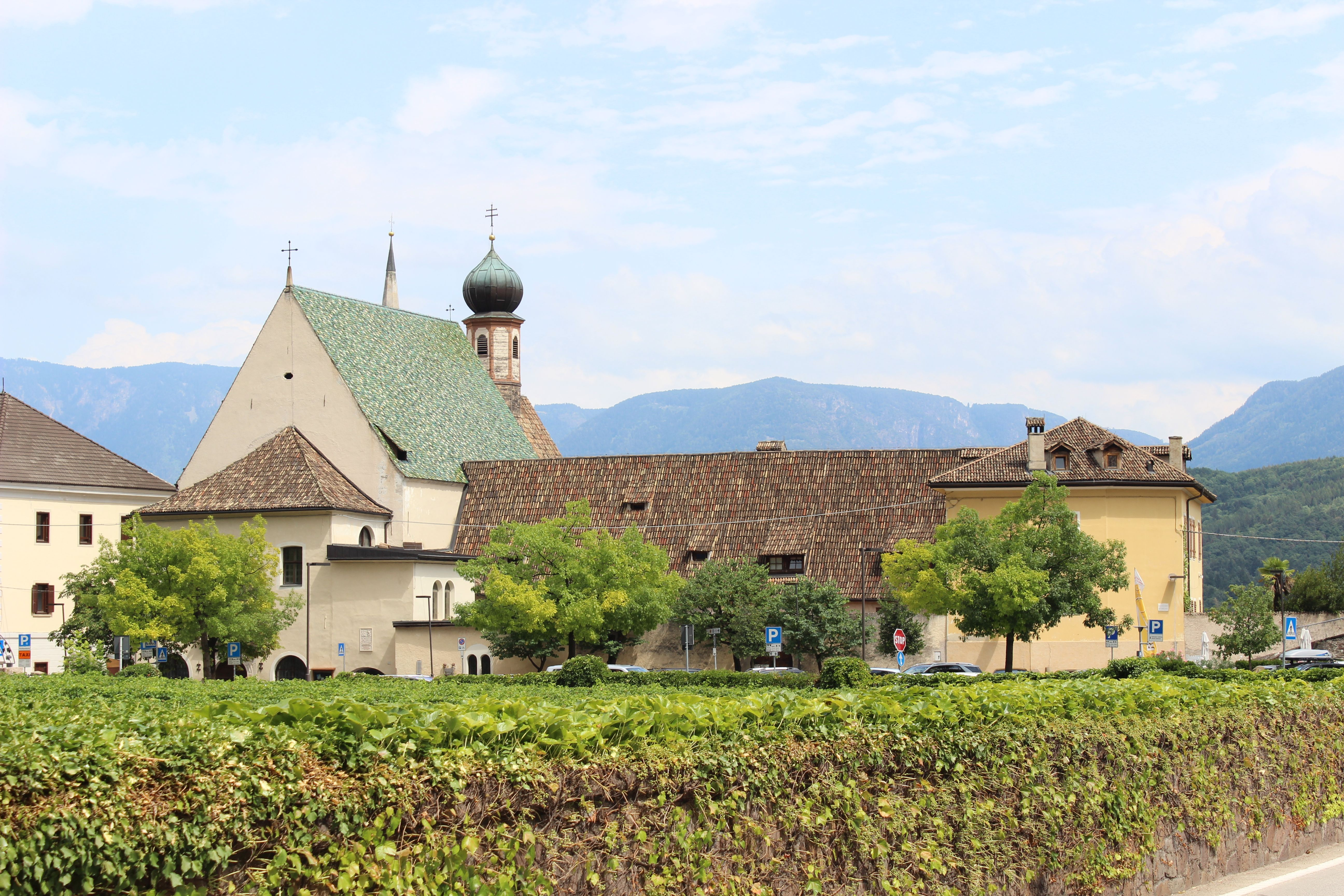
- Kaltern Friary (2015)

- Location within Trentino-Alto Adige/Südtirol

General information
- Location: Kaltern, South Tyrol, Italy
- Coordinates: 46°24′46″N 11°14′38″E

Kaltern Friary is a Franciscan friary in Kaltern (sometimes called Kaltern an der Weinstraße), South Tyrol, Italy. It is located in the centre of the little town and dates back to the 17th century.

== History ==
The first Franciscan friary in the area was founded in Bolzano in 1221. The establishment of a community in Kaltern, some ten miles to the south of Bolzano, was part of a more general second wave of Franciscan foundations that had originated with the reforms in the 15th century of Bernardino of Siena.

In 1638 two brothers, Sigismund and Christoff Greiff, who lived in Kaltern and were on good terms with the friary at Bolzano, proposed the establishment of a Franciscan friary in Kaltern and secured the agreement of the local council for their idea. The Tyrolean regent Claudia de' Medici was a keen supporter of the Franciscan movement, and on 17 March 1638 she provided the ruined castle, "Schloss Rottenburg", as a site for the new foundation. Local support was evident on 29 May 1639 when Franciscans and more than a thousand Christians from Kaltern and the surrounding district processed to the site and planted a cross on it. A plan to restore the ruined castle for use as a friary was soon abandoned on cost grounds, and the ruins were instead torn down in 1640. A new foundation stone was set in place on 27 March 1640 and the accommodation section of the conventual buildings was built on the site the same year with a large amount of the necessary labour provided by the townsfolk. The friary church was added during 1642 and 1643, and dedicated to Saint Claudia. As the centuries passed, however, the church became increasingly associated with Saint Anthony of Padua, of whom there was a picture directly to the right of the altar which attracted a growing number of pilgrims.

At the beginning of the 18th century, the church was extended to its present size. In 1810, with the region now integrated into Buonaparte's Kingdom of Italy, the friary was closed down and the premises auctioned off. Twenty local citizens grouped together and purchased it, and following further régime change in 1814, returned it to the Franciscans in return for reimbursement of the amount paid for it. The friary flourished during the rest of the 19th century, at one stage housing 23 Franciscan friars. Activities during this period included running an on-site theology college with up to seven students at a time.

During the 20th century the friary underwent a succession of renovations. In 1974 patronage of the church was formally transferred from Saint Claudia to Saint Anthony of Padua.

Since 1993 new forms of spirituality have been on offer at the friary under the banner of "Project Tau".
