= Tyrolean Folk Art Museum =

Austrian heritage museum

Coordinates: 47°16′7″N 11°23′44″E

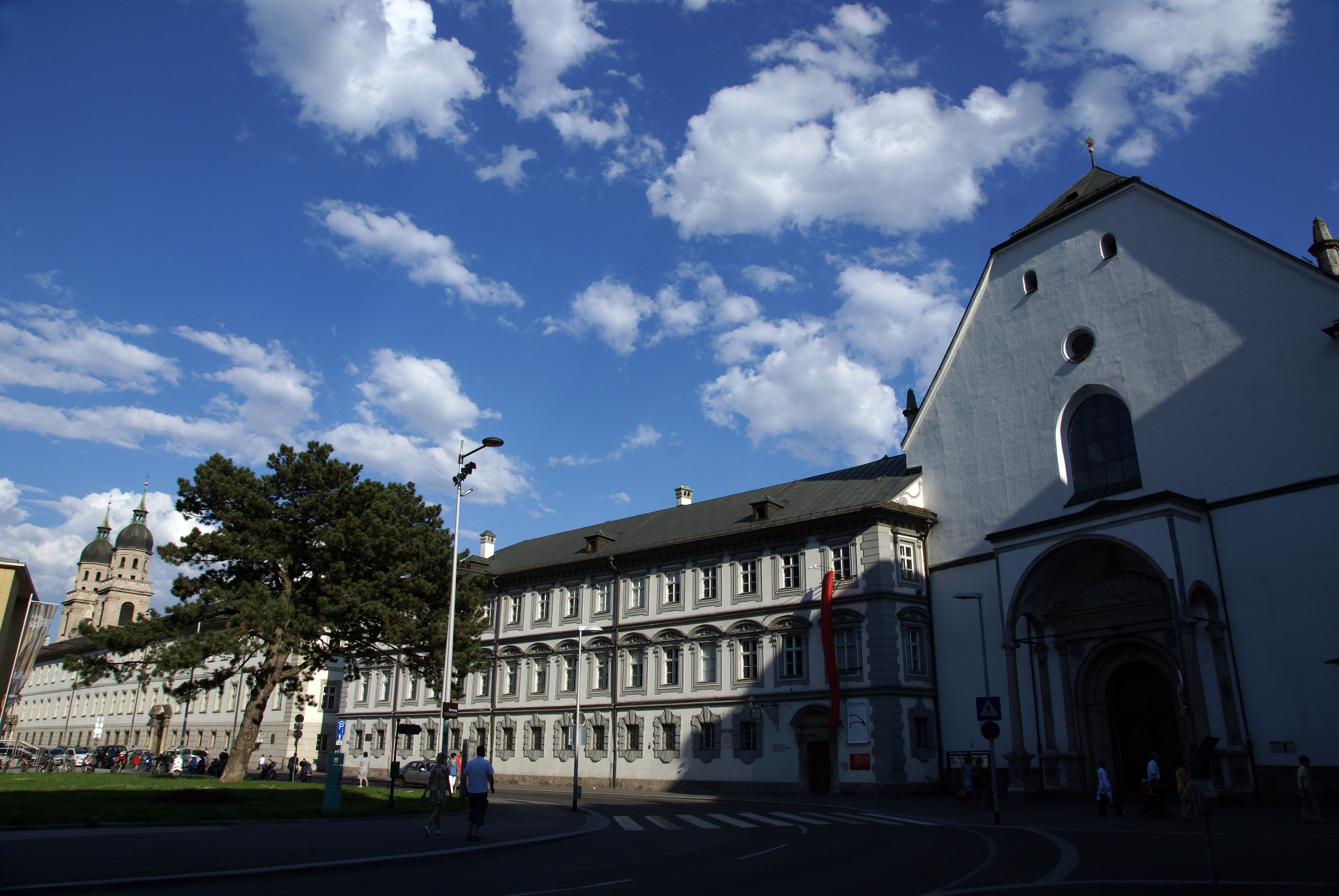
Tyrolean Folk Art Museum next to the Hofkirche in Innsbruck

The Tyrolean Folk Art Museum (German: Tiroler Volkskunstmuseum) is an Austrian heritage museum. Located next to the Hofkirche and across from the Hofburg in the Altstadt section of Innsbruck, Austria, the museum contains the most important collection of cultural artifacts from the Tyrol region.

The Tyrolean Folk Art Museum is housed in four wings of a former Franciscan monastery (the displaced community later established Lienz Friary) around an arcaded Renaissance courtyard. The permanent exhibition includes an extensive collection of old handicrafts, traditional costumes, household items, glass and pottery, peasant furniture, textiles, tools, metalwork, and religious and secular folk art from the various regions of Tyrol.

The museum houses several restored wood-paneled rooms from the Gothic, Renaissance, and Baroque periods, that came from historical farms and noble houses. The museum also contains an extensive collection of mangers made of wood, wax, earthenware, and paper, dating back to the eighteenth century.

== Gallery ==
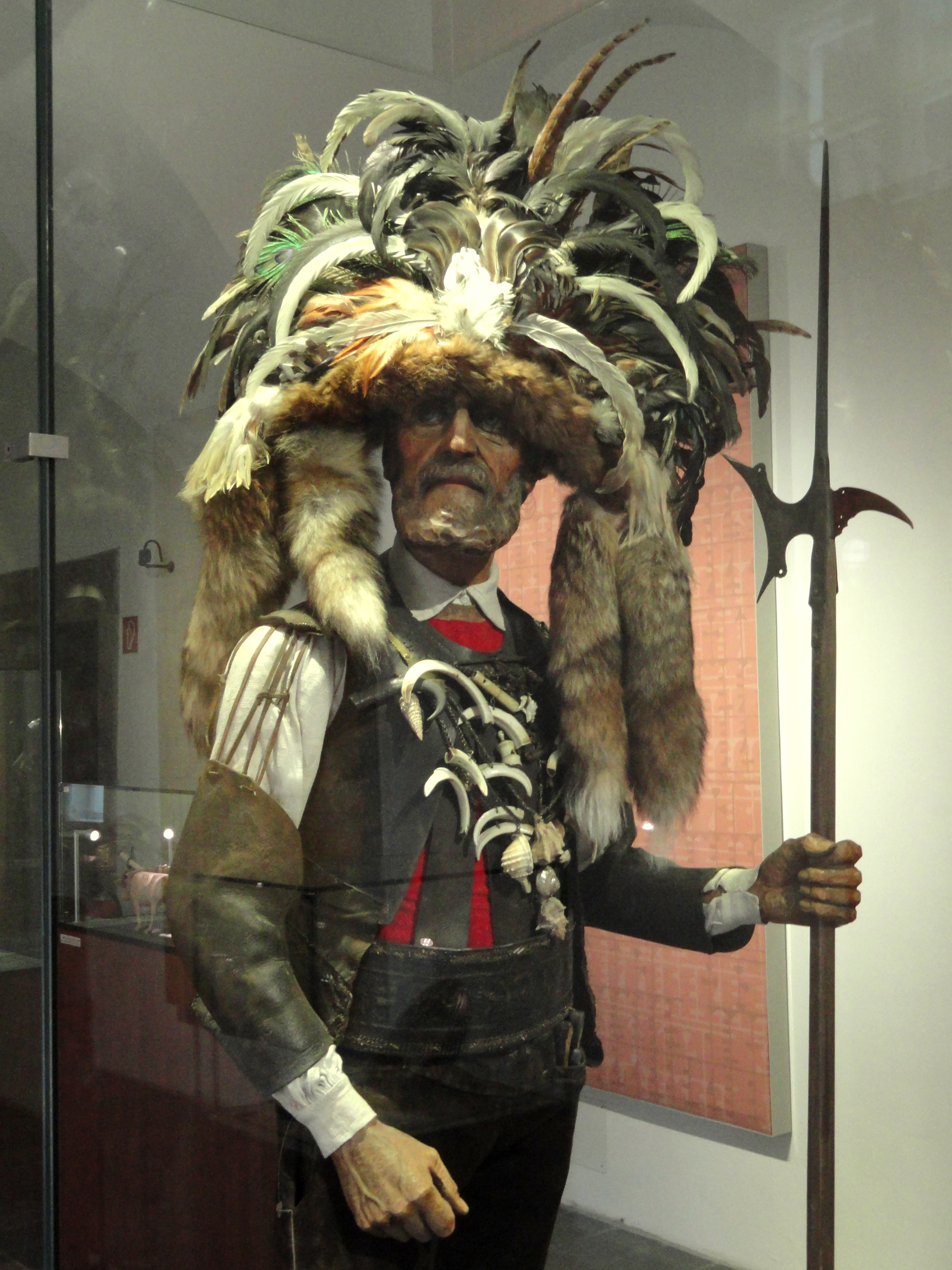

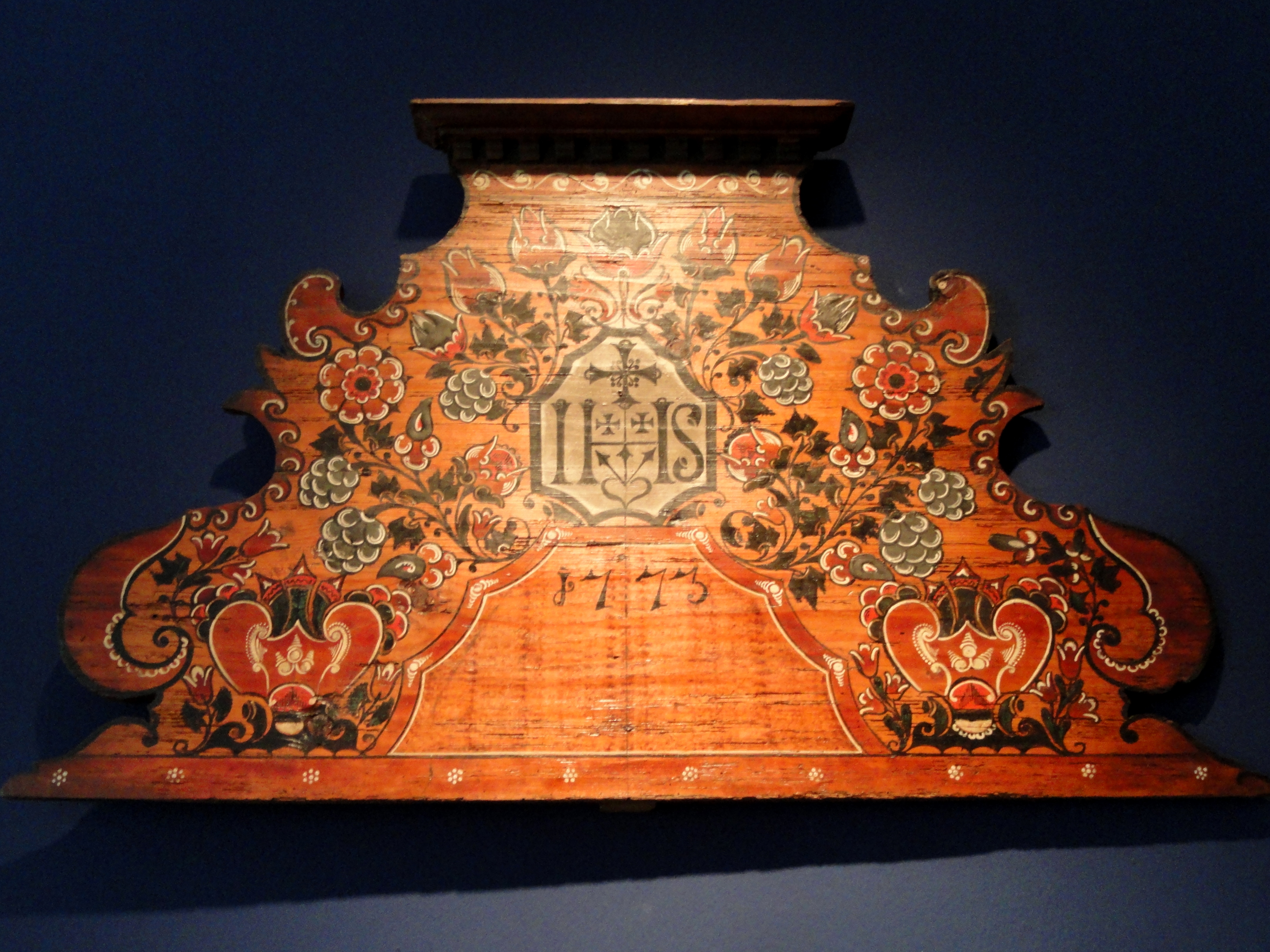

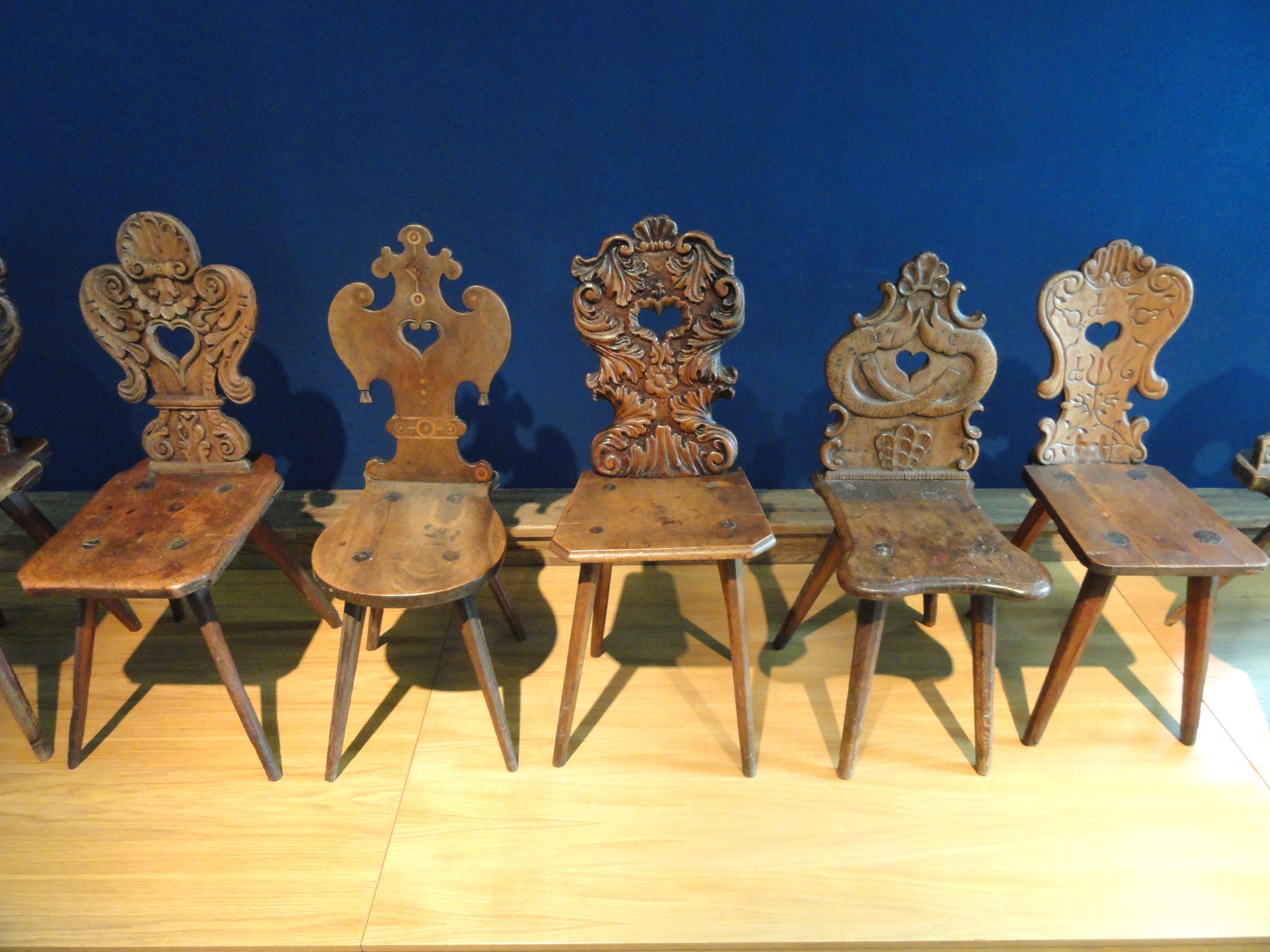

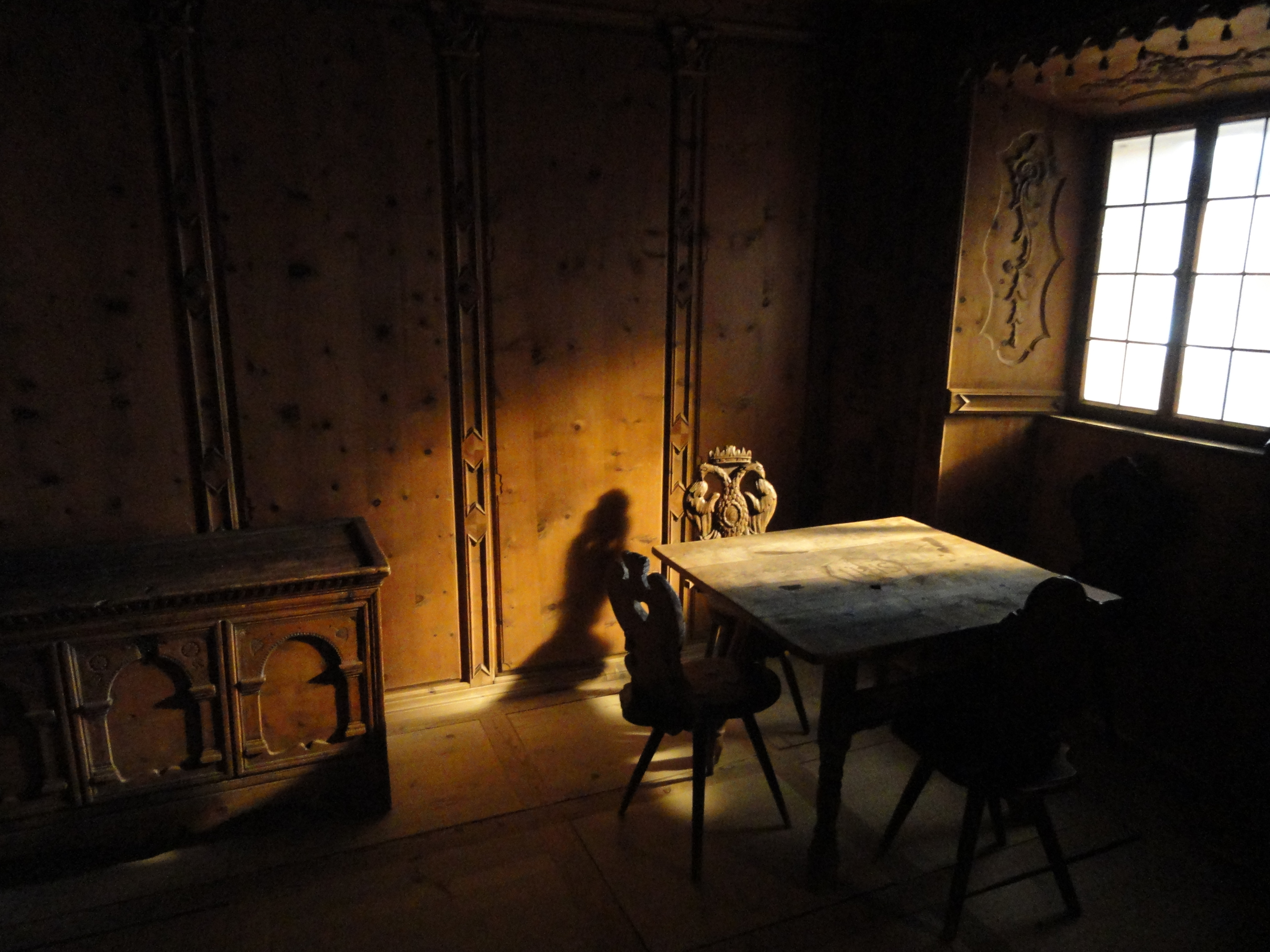

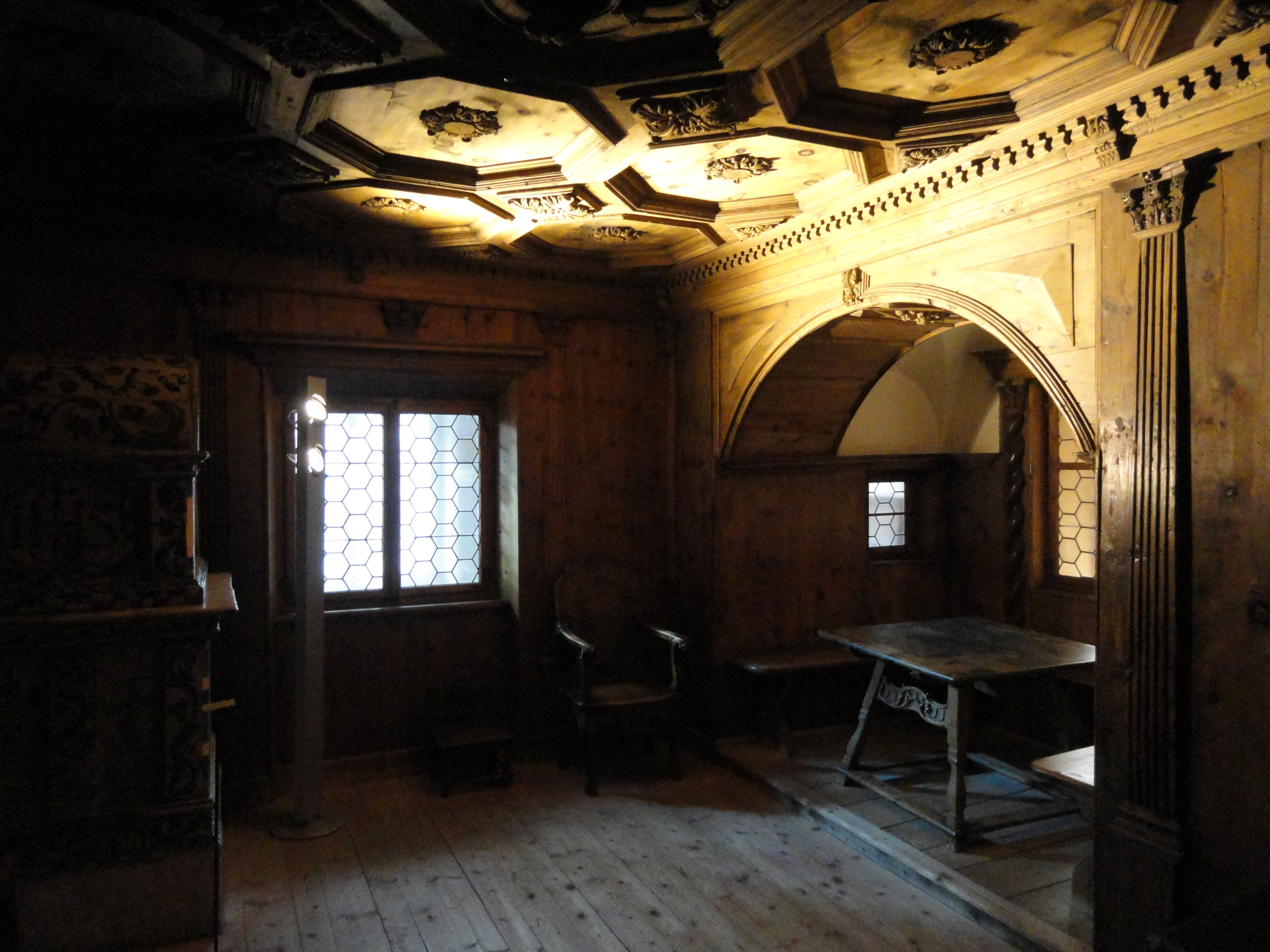

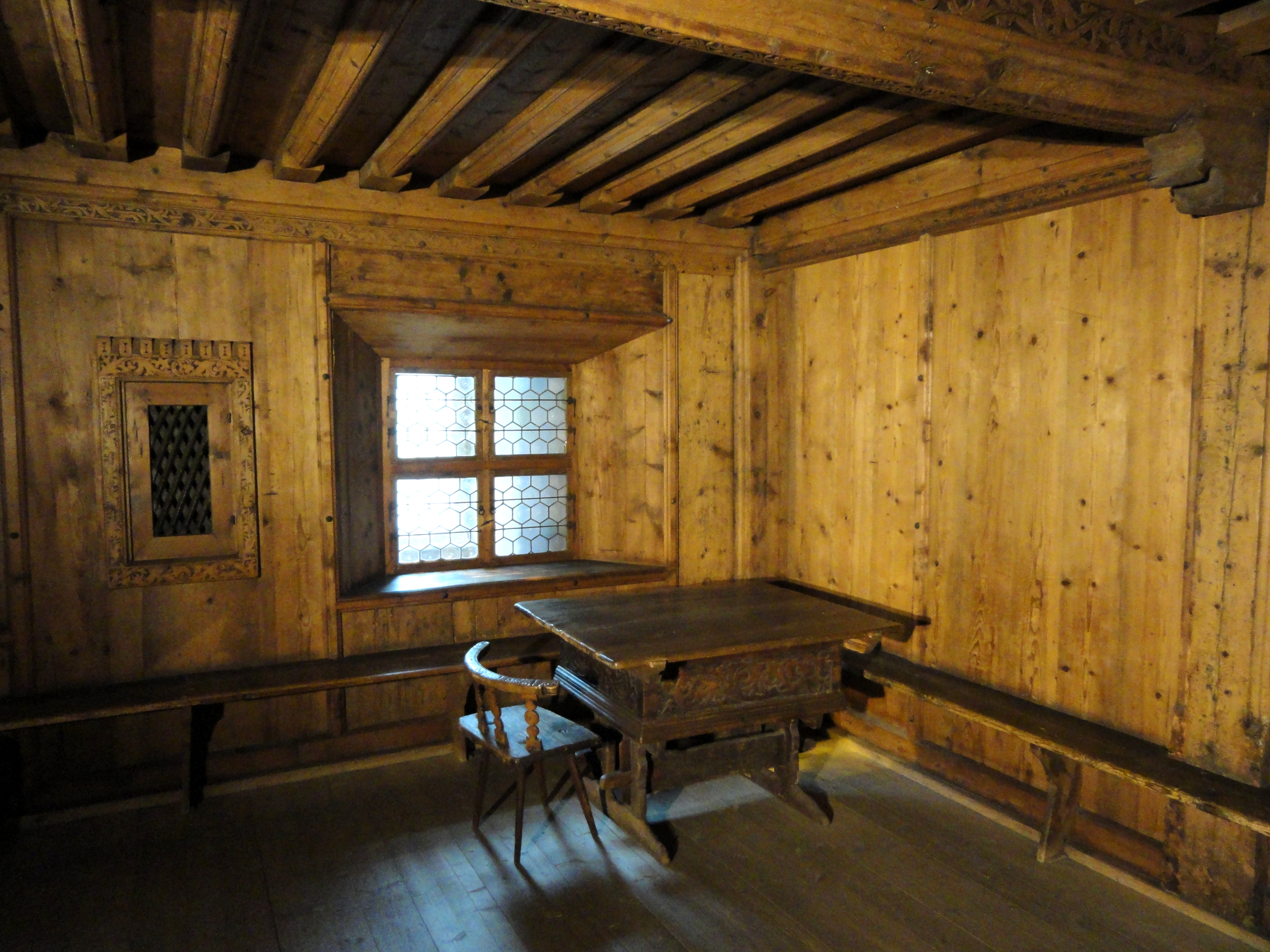

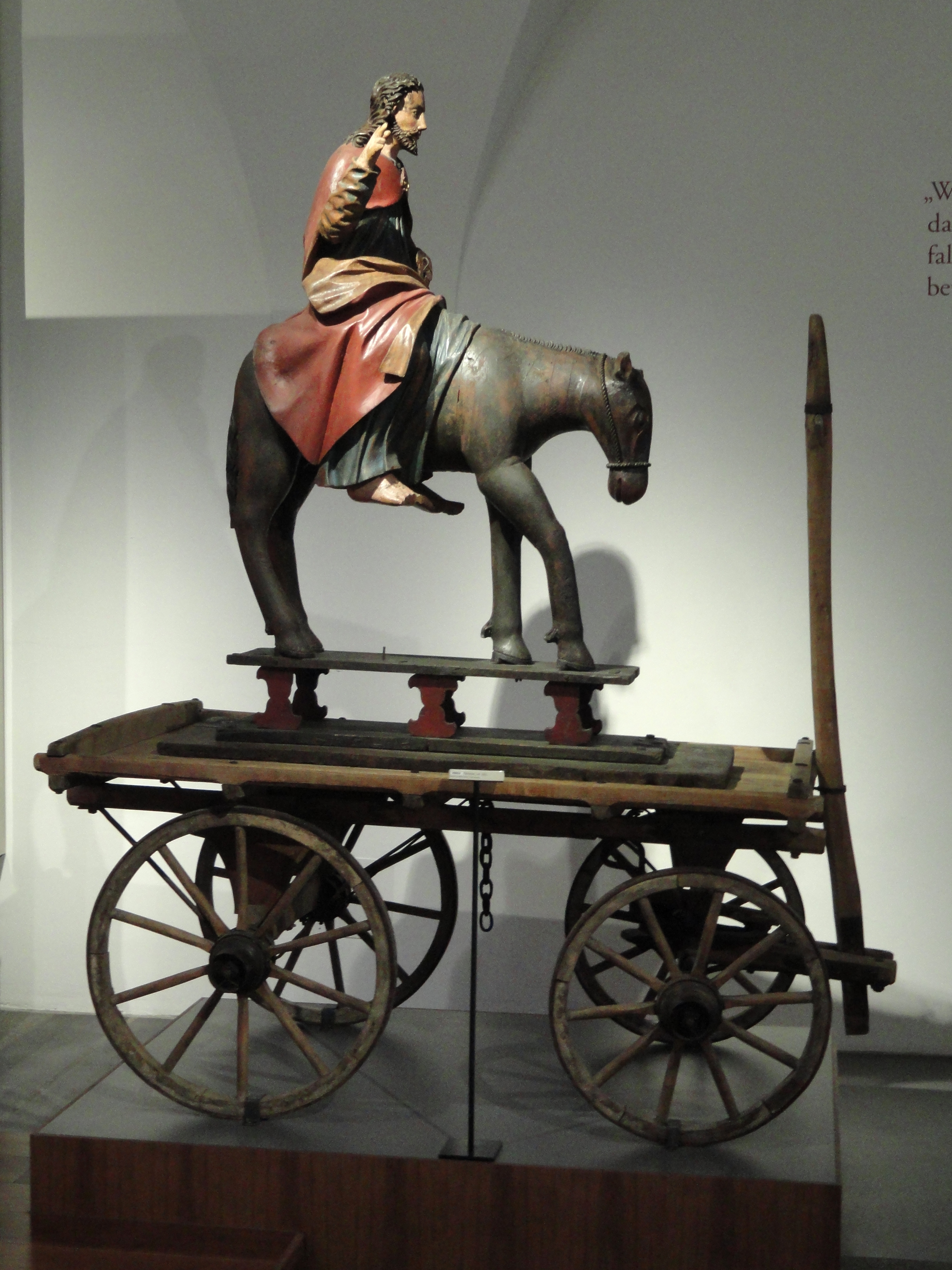

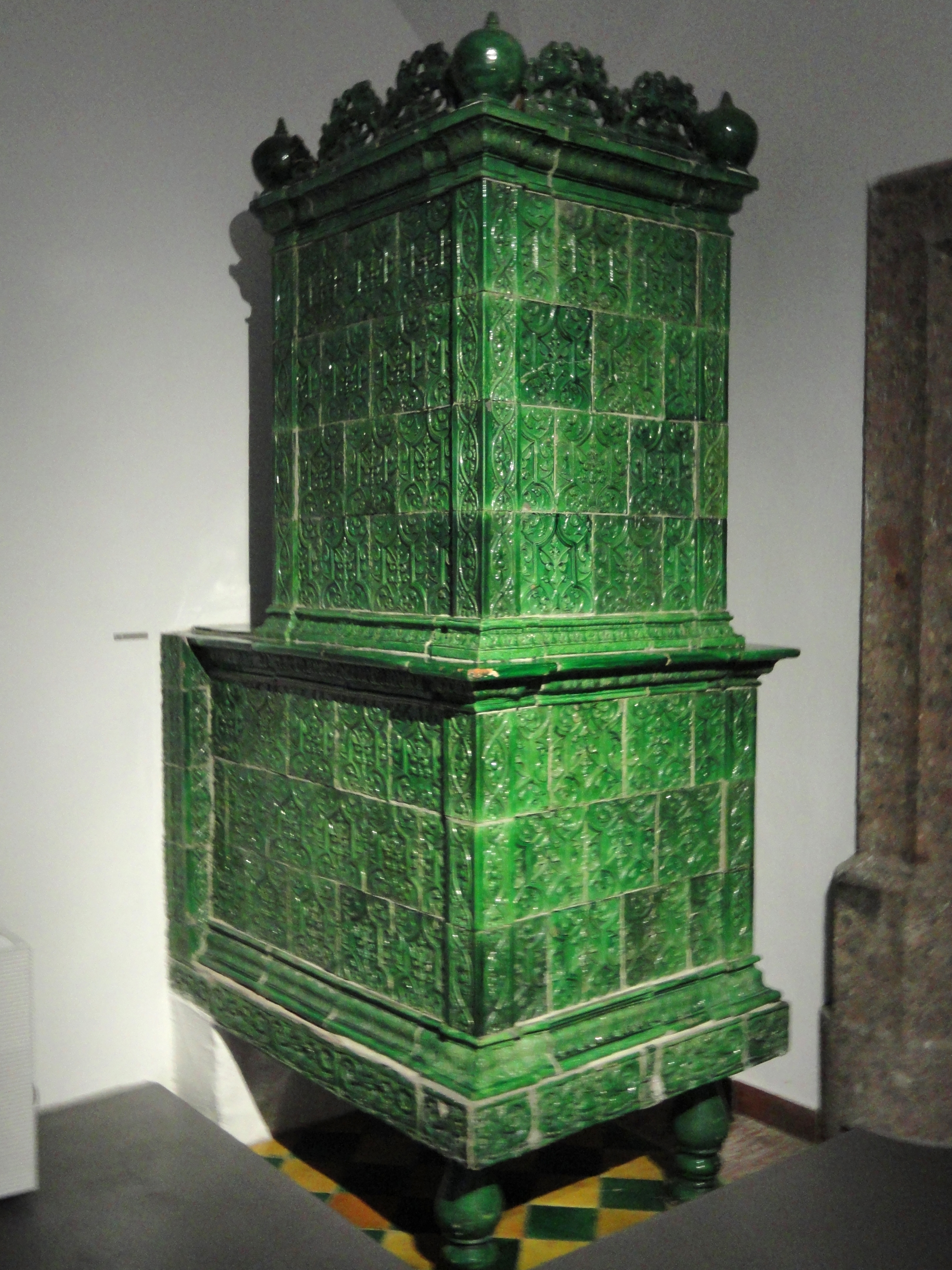
