= Villach Friary =

Franciscan friary in southern Austria

Coordinates: 46°36′58.50″N 13°50′57.95″E

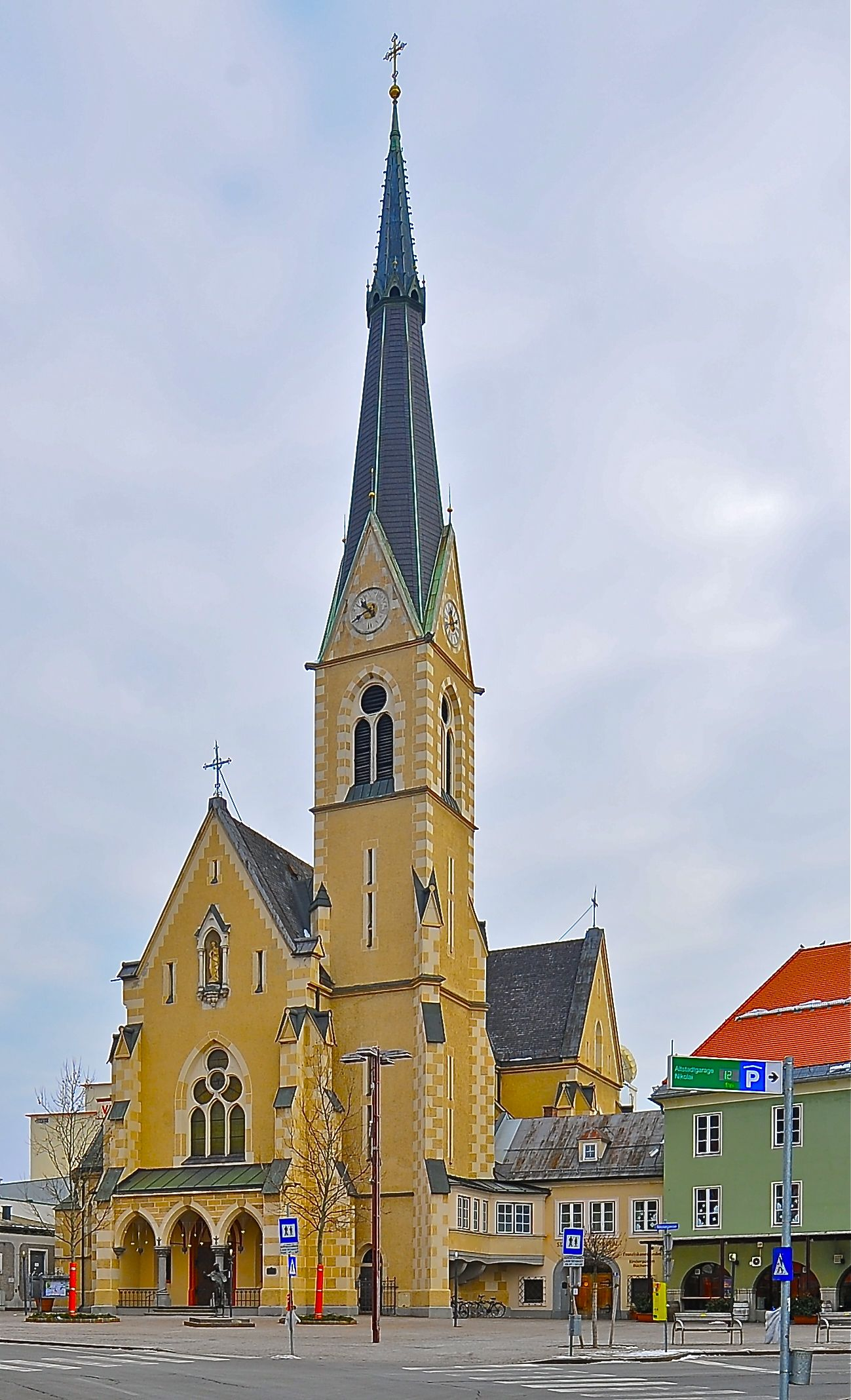
St. Nicholas' Church

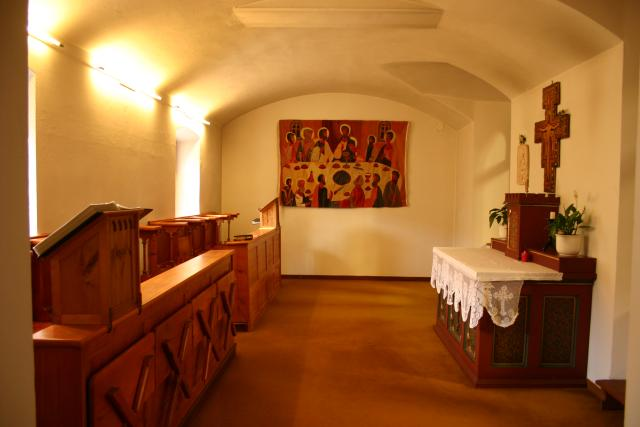
Oratory in the friary

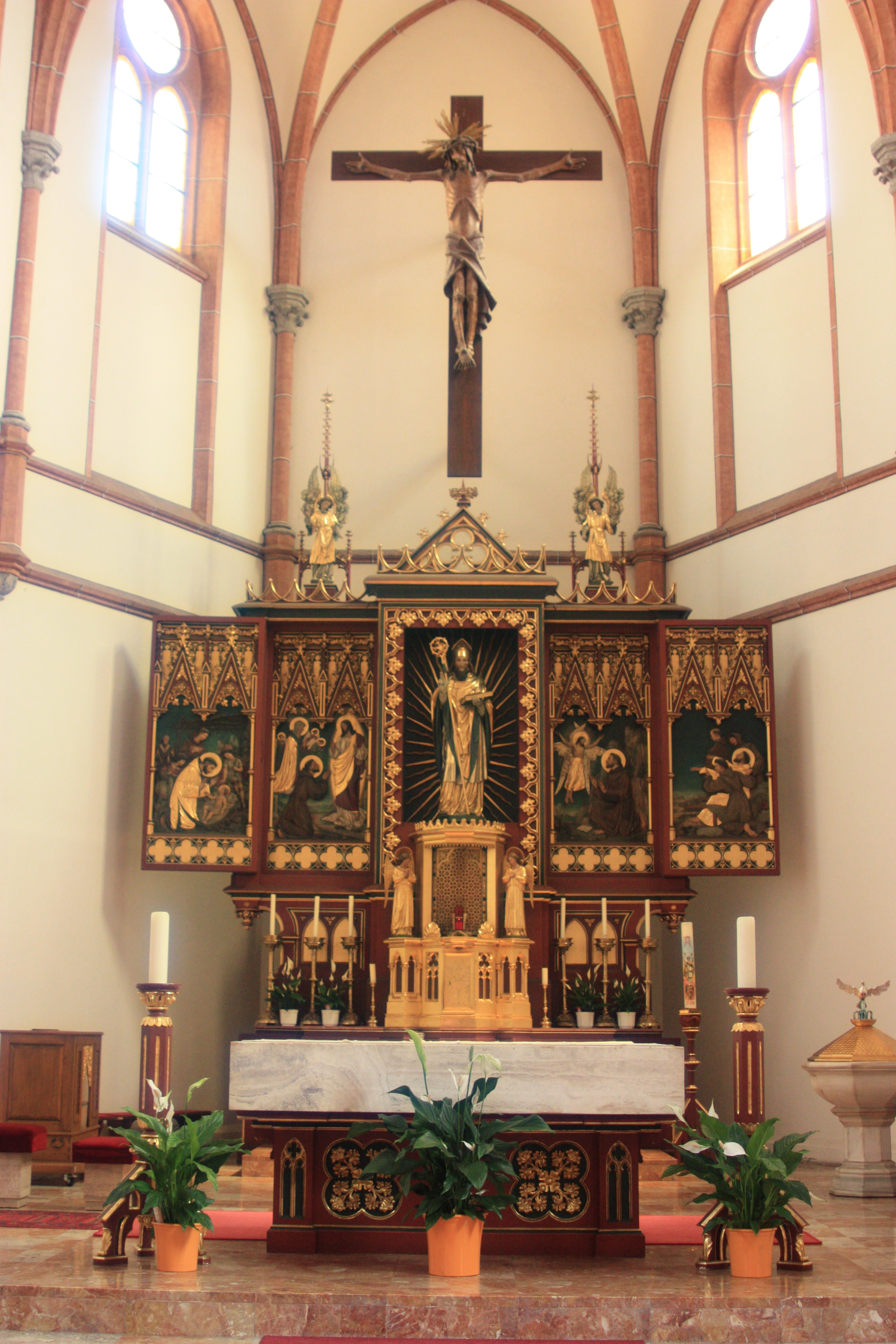
Nikolai-Kirche Villach

Villach Friary (German: Franziskanerkloster Villach) is a Franciscan friary, responsible for the parish of St. Nicholas (Sankt Nikolai) in Villach, Carinthia, Austria.

== History ==
In 1886, because of a great shortage of priests, Mgr. Peter Funder, bishop of Gurk, asked the Tyrolean Franciscan Province to take on the spiritual care of the parish of Sankt Nikolai in Villach. In the same year the first Franciscans arrived in the town and moved into the Capuchin friary, suppressed in 1786. Both the friary and the next-door church were so desolate, however, that both had to be demolished in the following year and rebuilt. Most of the cost was borne by Stephan Dionys Cserveny von Zabor from Salzburg. Thus, despite massive resistance from the municipal authorities, the friary was newly established in 1888 and the removal of the old church began in 1890/91. The church and the high altar were built to plans by the Franciscan Fr. Johannes Maria Reiter and were formally consecrated in 1896.

The Franciscans have since devoted themselves to the care of the parish. In 1945 the church was damaged by a bomb, and had to be partly rebuilt after the war. The building was restored several times in the second half of the 20th century, and in 1981 the crypt was adapted for the celebration of divine service.

== Church of St. Nicholas ==
The friary and parish church of St. Nicholas (Sankt Nikolai) were built in Gothic Revival style. The church is 48.5 metres long by 20 metres wide, and at the highest point of the nave is 17 metres high. The church tower is just under 64 metres high.

Since the church was built under the patronage of the Tyrolean Franciscan Province, several notable Tyrolean artists were involved in it:

- the high altar was made to designs by Fr. Johannes Maria Reiter by the art cabinet maker Clemens Raffeiner from Schwaz
- the statue of Saint Nicholas and various reliefs were by the sculptor Josef Bachlechner from Hall in Tirol
- the frescoes of the childhood of Jesus in the nave are by the academic painter Emanuel Walch
- the Stations of the Cross are by the sculptor Schmalz from Gröden

== Bibliography ==
Franz Scheibl, 1986: St. Nikolai 1886–1986. Villach
