= Franciscan Friary, Bolzano =

Italian church

- Das Franziskanerkloster, Bozen; Il Convento dei Francescani, Bolzano
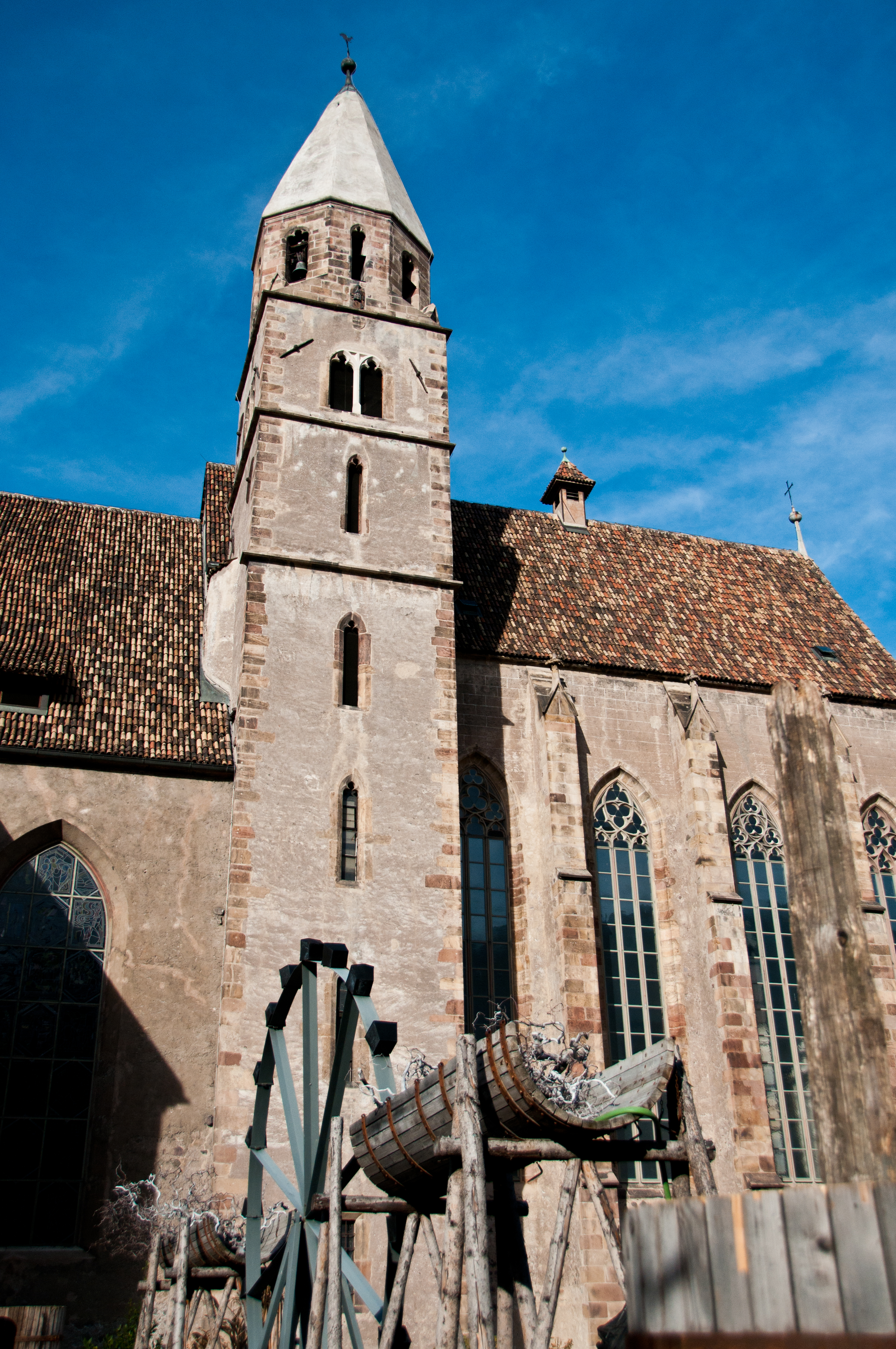
- Franciscan Church, Bolzano

- Location within Trentino-Alto Adige/Südtirol

General information
- Location: Bolzano, South Tyrol, Italy
- Coordinates: 46°30′2.61″N 11°21′15.03″E

The Franciscan Friary, Bolzano (German: Franziskanerkloster, Bozen; Italian: Convento dei Francescani, Bolzano) is a Franciscan friary in the city of Bolzano, in South Tyrol, northern Italy. It was founded in 1221, less than a century after Bolzano was refounded as a trading centre on the important Brenner route connecting the March of Verona and Italy with the Holy Roman Empire north of The Alps.

The friary is located in Bolzano's central Boden-Rentsch quarter. The friary and its church are home to some important frescoes and other art works. Although Bolzano has been an Italian city since 1919, its Franciscan friary has since 2007 been part of the Franciscan Order of Austria for historical reasons.

== History ==
A legend survives that Saint Francis, while still young, accompanied his cloth merchant father, Pietro Bernardone, on a business trip to Bolzano. While there, the young Francis took Mass in the Chapel of Saints Ingenuinus and Erhard, and the bells rang out. The Chapel is today part of the friary complex.

In 1221 Franciscan friars visited Bolzano, while en route for a mission for the founder of their order to the emperor at Speyer. They obtained from the Bishop of Trento permission to preach at Bolzano, which came within his authority. It appears that some of these itinerants stayed behind in Bolzano, because in 1237 there is already a record of a Franciscan settlement by the city walls. The very first friary was built around a yard made available by the Bishop of Brixen directly outside the city walls on the north side of Bolzano, incorporating the Church of Saints Ingenuinus and Erhard. However, the original structure was destroyed by fire in 1291 and the friary was rebuilt in 1322. In 1348 the Franciscan church belonging to it was ready to be consecrated.

The start of the 16th century saw a loss of discipline, notably with regard to the Franciscan Vow of Poverty. Following years of conflict and division within the Franciscan Order, 1514 was a year of important monastic reform in Bolzano which adopted the "Observants" principles. In 1580 the friary at Bolzano became part of the newly established stand-alone Franciscan Tirolean Province.

In 1780 the Empress Maria Theresa inaugurated the city's Franciscan Gymnasium (school) for which the friary was mandated to provide the teaching and leadership. During the time of Bavarian occupation, in 1810, the friary found itself abolished and some of its lands forfeit, shortly after which the buildings were used as a military barracks till 1813. However, the region was restored to Austria following the defeat of Napoleon and the Franciscans were able to return to their friary.

The church was destroyed on 29 March 1944 by aerial bombing, but was rebuilt after the war. During the immediate postwar years the South Tyrol was one of the few German-speaking regions of Europe not under the direct military control of the winning powers, and the friary was one of a number of establishments in the region used as a temporary hiding place for high-ranking Nazis heading for more permanent refuges outside Europe. A high-profile case was that of Adolf Eichmann, brought to the friary by the priest of Sterzing, Johann Corradini.

As part of the ongoing negotiations to resolve the cultural and linguistic tensions that plagued the South Tyrol during the decades that followed the transfer of this German-speaking region to Italy (and the ensuing attempts under Benito Mussolini to eliminate German elements), an agreement was reached whereby in 2007, for church administration purposes, the Franciscan friary in Bolzano was transferred to the church's Austrian Province, under the direction of Salzburg.

== The Franciscan Church ==
The church tower is 44 metres high and was completed in 1376. It is topped off with an octagonal pyramid above eight little acoustic windows.

The Gothic church itself comprises a three-aisled nave and a choir section with a polygonal plan, under a ribbed arched roof, all primarily constructed out of pink sandstone. The apse is dominated by three large windows of modern stained glass, which are the work of the Innsbruck artist, Josef Widmoser. The middle window shows the Stigmata appearing on Saint Francis, to whom the church is dedicated. The window on the left shows three scenes: the lowest is of the saint returning his rich clothes and his money to his father: the middle scene shows Saint Francis appearing before the Pope in order to obtain authorization for the creation of his order, and the scene at the top shows King Louis IX of France, sometimes known as Saint Louis, with Elizabeth of Hungary, another royal princess venerated as a saint. The window on the right is also divided into three scenes devoted to Francis of Assisi: at the top he is shown between Christ and His Mother: the middle scene shows the saint preaching to the birds, which is a particularly well-known aspect of his ministry; and the lower scene shows his death.

The choir accommodates an elaborately carved and painted late Gothic "winged altar" constructed around 1500 by Hans Klocker. This was originally housed in the St Anna Chapel that was built at the same time as the church and in 1373 donated by the Vintler family of Bolzano. The central portion, visible when the "wings" are opened, shows the birth of Jesus with much associated detail from the Bible narratives of the event, while both sides of the "wings" show episodes from the later life of Christ. One of them also includes a depiction of Saint Clare of Assisi.

The nave originally had a flat roof, but received a vaulted roof with octagonal pillars during the early 1450s. On the south side of the church the space formerly occupied by the St Anna Chapel was filled in 1680 by three Baroque side chapels. Both the north and south aisles accommodate a diverse selection of church art. The north aisle also accommodates a modern organ, installed in 1995 and built by Johann Pirchner of Steinach. The instrument's 44 registers include 9 featuring "reeds". There are three manuals along with the pedals. Although the instrument takes its principal inspiration from organs of the Baroque period, notably those of Gottfried Silbermann, the availability of a range of reeds makes it suitable for 19th century music as well, especially that of the French Romantic composers.

== Cloisters ==
The Gothic cloisters date back to the 14th century, and are decorated by a succession of frescoes of the Giotto school, although the surviving display is fragmentary. There are also fragments visible from later centuries of 17th century interventions and additions by Ludwig Pfendter and others.
