= Lienz Friary =

- Franziskanerkloster Lienz
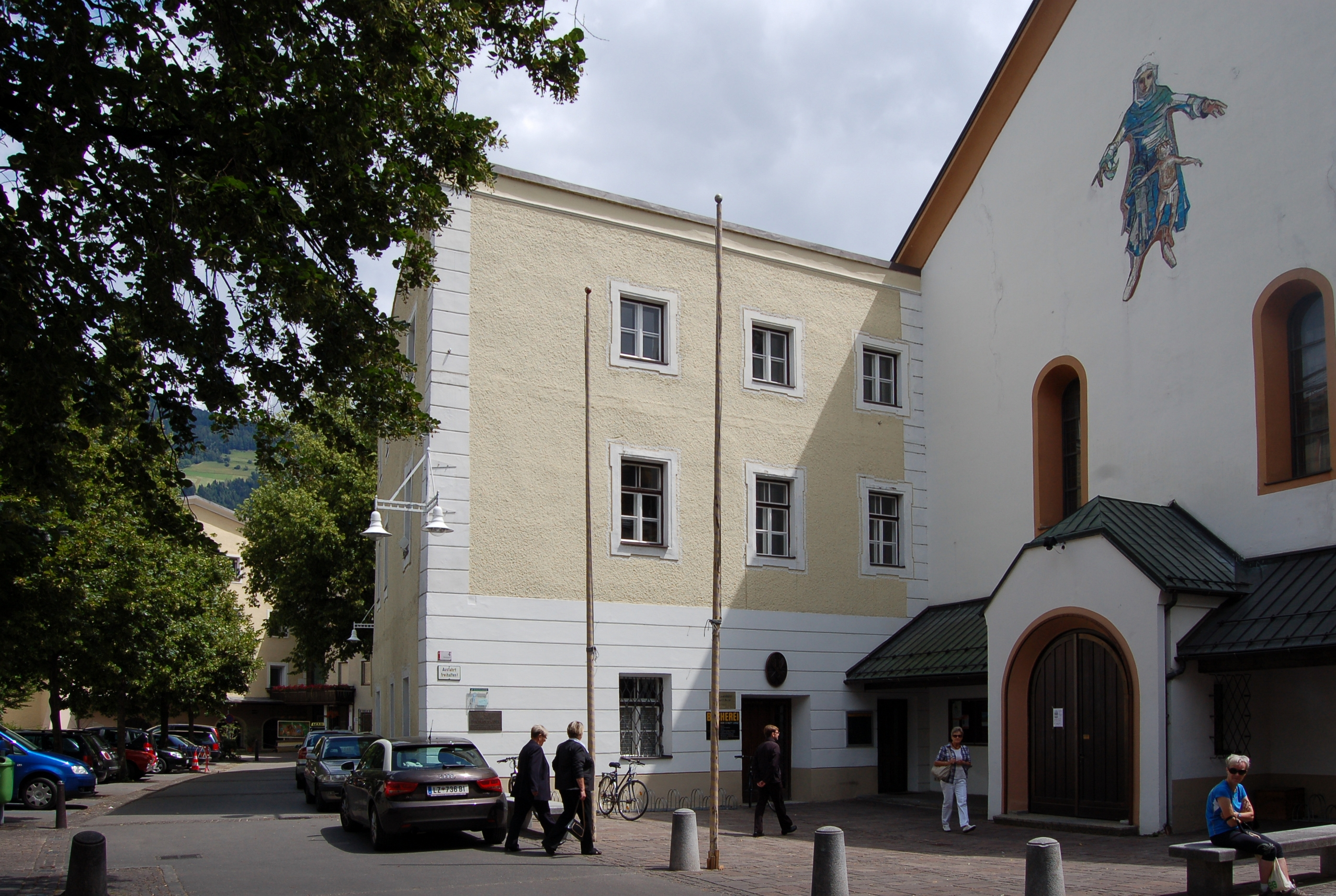
- Lienz Friary (2011)

- Location within Austria

General information
- Location: Lienz, East Tyrol, Austria
- Coordinates: 46°49′50″N 12°45′58″E

Lienz Friary (German: Franziskanerkloster Lienz) is a Franciscan friary in the centre of the town of Lienz in East Tyrol, Austria, formerly a Carmelite friary.

== History ==
=== Carmelites ===
The Carmelite friary in Lienz was founded in 1349 by the Countess Euphemia of Görz and her two sons, Albert IV and Meinhard VII. It was set up for a community of twelve residents but the number of brothers rose to about 20. In 1430 a vicariate was set up for the friary in Tristach, which along with the contributions of the populace and the noble families secured its financial stability. Although it burned down several times in the following centuries, it always received enough in donations to be able to rebuild. In about 1450 a theological college for the Carmelite Order was housed here. In the early 16th century the prior, Lucas Zach, introduced a reform to ensure that the Carmelite rule was better followed.

From 1748 to 1773 the Carmelites took on the serving of the parish of Tristach. From 1775 they also taught in the ordinary town school (Normalschule) and from 1777 worked as professors in the Gymnasium of Lienz. Nevertheless, the friary was unable to avoid the wave of monastic suppressions under Joseph II. On 21 March 1785 the community were instructed to vacate the premises to make way for a Franciscan community previously displaced from their friary in Innsbruck. The conventual buildings, the church and all possessions passed to the state "religion fund". Most of the inventory was sold to the profit of the fund, including the valuable library of 4,640 volumes and 168 manuscripts. On 16 April 1785 the Franciscans moved in. Some of the 21 dispossessed Carmelites remained in the town, where nine of them died.

=== Carmelite remains ===
Some works of art remain from the Carmelite period:

- Gothic frescoes (15th century)
- cloister, with pictures from 1705
- the chapter room
- the Carmelites' vault (Karmelitergruft) in the cloister by the sacristy, with the names of 7 Carmelites of the 18th century
- pictures of the founder, Countess Euphemia von Görz and of Prior Lucas Zach

=== Franciscans ===
As a replacement for the Franciscan friary in Innsbruck, which was suppressed by Emperor Joseph II on 11 April 1785 and the premises of which now accommodate the Tyrolean Museum of Folk Art, the Franciscans were granted the Carmelite friary in Lienz, thus displacing the Carmelites who occupied it. The Franciscans moved into the vacated premises on 19 April 1785. Their duties were the care of souls and the provision of schooling in Lienz. Of the 22 members of the new community six were professors at the Lienz Gymnasium and another two were teachers at the ordinary school (Normalschule). From 1787 till now the Franciscans have also assisted the nearby convent of Dominican nuns as confessors. In 1788 an auxiliary priest was attached to the friary church for the use of the townspeople, and the Franciscans began their care of souls in the hospital.

On 11 April 1798 during the fire of Lienz the roofs of the friary and of the church were destroyed. In addition, the first decades of the friary were very turbulent thanks to the political conditions (Age of Enlightenment, Tyrolean struggle for independence). In 1807 the Gymnasium was closed by the ruling Bavarian administration, which removed the source of income of the Franciscans. In 1809 much of the friary had to be vacated for the billetting of soldiers. The unrest caused the community to drop to 13 in 1815, but the numbers later picked up again and the friars were able to resume their work in Lienz.

The National Socialist period caused difficulties. In 1938 the Franciscans were forbidden to collect food. In 1940 large parts of the premises were ordered to be cleared for the accommodation of a proposed museum, which was however afterwards established in Schloss Bruck. After the end of the war, in 1948, Bishop Paulus Rusch attached the parish of St Mary's to the friary church. For the parish activities the friary was enlarged in 1968 and from 1974 to 1978 the church was renovated.

Today (as of 2015) 5 or so Franciscans look after the parish, which has about 4,200 Catholic residents, and are also available for other spiritual duties of care in Lienz and the surrounding area. They are also active in the spiritual care of the hospital, old peoples' homes and the Dominican convent.

=== Works of art of the Franciscan period ===
- Altar with a representation of the Virgin Mary among the Apostles, by José Pirkner (1976)
- Mosaic of the Virgin Mary as the Giver of All Graces on the west front, by José Pirkner (1978)
- Lourdes grotto in the cloister (1972)

== Bibliography ==
Florentin Nothegger: Sondernummer der Osttiroler Heimatblätter zum 200jährigen Bestand des Franziskanerklosters Lienz. Lienz 1985.
