= Hans Klocker =

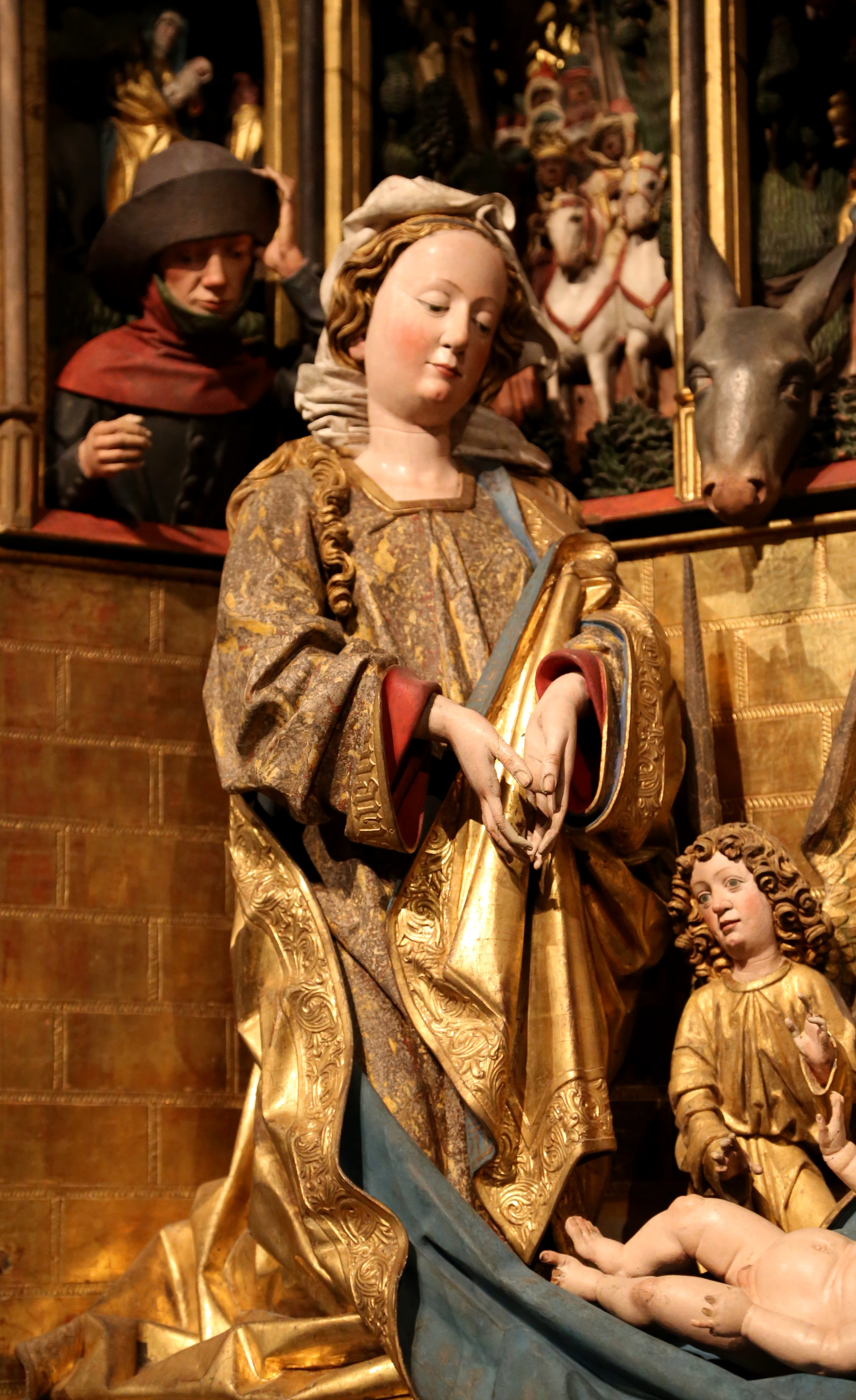
Detail of the Tramin altarpiece by Hans Klocker

Hans Klocker (before 1474 – after 1500) was a late Gothic sculptor, active in South Tyrol.

== Biography ==
Hans Klocker seems to have been active at the court of the bishop of Brixen since 1477, although he is mentioned for the first time in this context in 1482. He is known to have created an altarpiece for the church in St. Leonhard in Passeier in 1486-90 and 1498 he was working on another for the church in Kaltern an der Weinstraße. The last time his name is mentioned is in 1500, when he made an altarpiece for the Franciscans in Brixen. Altarpieces by his hand are also known from Tramin an der Weinstraße (now in the Bavarian National Museum, Munich), Montan (now in Bolzano City Museum) and Villnöß.
