= White Tower (Brixen) =

- Weißer Turm
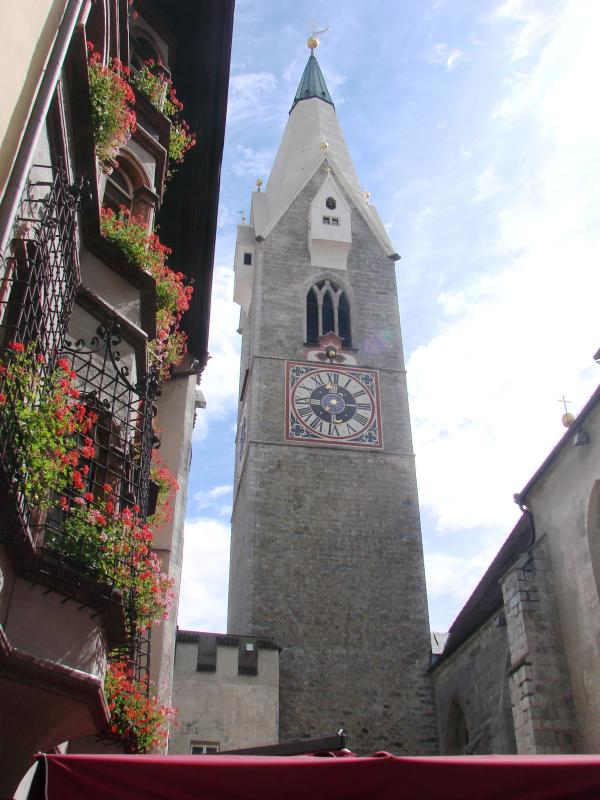
- White Tower in Brixen

- Location in South Tyrol White Tower (Brixen) (Italy) White Tower (Brixen) (Europe)

General information
- Type: Clock tower
- Architectural style: Gothic
- Location: Brixen, (flag) Italy
- Coordinates: 46°42′59″N 11°39′28″E
- Construction started: 1459
- Completed: 1591; 435 years ago
- Affiliation: Catholicism

Height
- Height: 72 metres (236 ft)

Technical details
- Floor count: Seven

Website
- https://www.brixen.org/it/cultura/musei/rid-351A11FAAA094B38910617CF8FA47846-museo-nella-torre-bianca.html

The White Tower (German: Weißer Turm [ˈvaɪsɐ ˈtʊrm]) is located in Brixen, a small town in South Tyrol, Italy. It dates back to the 15th century. The Gothic tower stands 72m tall and the cathedral close to it is dedicated to Saint Michael. Along with the two towers of the Cathedral of Brixen, it is one of the emblems of the city's bishopric. It has about 200 stairs which lead to the complex carillon mechanism of 43 bells. After its restoration in 2006, the White Tower is used as a museum. The White Tower is a registered cultural heritage monument (number 14186) in South Tyrol.

== History ==
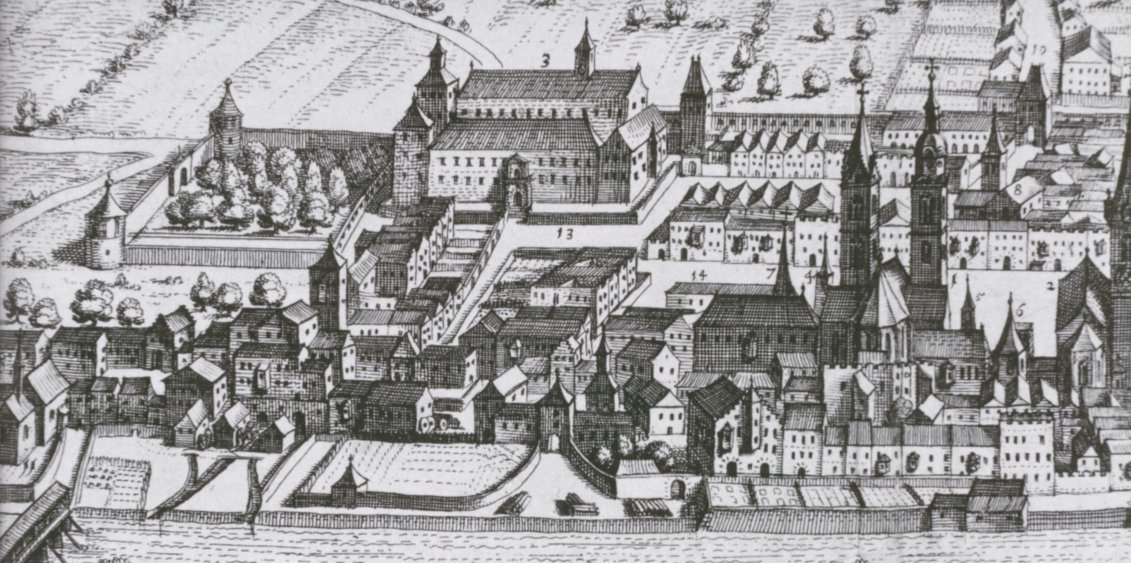
View of the city of Brixen in a print dated 1679.

The construction of the tower started in the 15th century. In 1444 the tower caught fire and in 1459 the theologian Nicholas of Cusa commissioned its reconstruction in a Gothic style. Because of the tower's new roof color, the local population named it "Black Tower". In 1591 an octagonal brick helmet was constructed, and the roof of the tower was painted white, so it was renamed the "White Tower". These rebuilding works increased the overall height of the Tower, making it the tallest building and the symbol of the city of Brixen. Because of its height and its dominant position over the historic centre of the city, the tower was used by a night watchman, who lived there and was able to get a complete overview of the surroundings. The Tower originally had a copper dome, the so-called "Black Dome". It was later removed and replaced with a white thin plate made by war debris in 1918. The Tower also had a double-sloped roof, which was used by firemen to detect potential fires. This type of roof was often copied in the area near the city of Brixen .

=== From "Black Tower" to "White Tower" ===
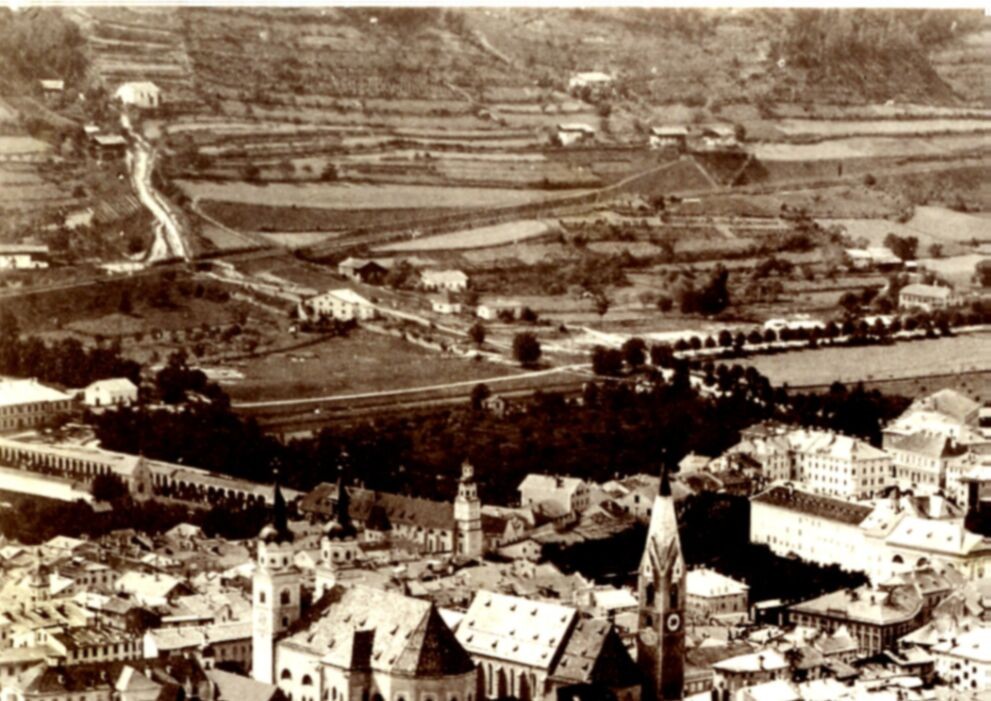
The White Tower in 1914.

The naming convention changed from "Black Tower" to "White Tower"; the height of the tower was also increased. It received a Gothic bell chamber and a pointed octagonal Gothic helmet, which was made of masonry in 1591 and dyed white.

The "White Tower" is one of the few architectural reminders of the late Gothic Style in South Tyrol. A large part of the ecclesiastical and secular building stock of the city of Brixen had been converted to Baroque style after 1600 or had undergone historical redesigns in the 19th century. In the history of houses in Brixen by Mader and Sparber, reference is made to a coloured pen drawing with coats of arms and sayings, which is exhibited in the Diocesan Museum showing multiple milestones about the history of the Tower.

== Interior of the "White Tower" ==
The tour of the "White Tower" begins from some outside stairs leading to the west side up to an entrance door with iron leads. The first inside staircase is bricked and leads from the center towards north on the first floor. Here, the counterweights of the old clock are located where initially there used to be the ropes used to ring the bells.

Connected through a mezzanine to the rise to the next flight of stairs, on the third floor there is a wooden scaffolding on which, in the past, ropes and counterweights were placed. This is also the place where the watchman controlled the city of Brixen. The mechanical clock is on the fourth floor, made by a wooden cabinet that is accessible through a short flight of stairs from the east. The rise goes up to five illuminated loopholes to the east, one above the other.

From here begins the climb to the fifth floor, where gears and regulators for the three clocks on the east are located . On the south side, at the height of the clocks double lancet window, a sundial is attached. The rise to the sixth floor opens towards the bell chair containing six bells. The room is divided into three by an entablature: west, center and east. In the center is located the great one, dedicated to Saint Michael Bell Jar.

The eastern sector contains three bells, the most important is the Sacred Heart of Jesus. The western sector houses two bells: one of them is consecrated to Our Lady, the other serves as a death knell.

The passage of time is displayed through two different ringing bells: one of the bells is dedicated to St. Michael, for which the hours struck and the sound of the quarter of an hour is dedicated to Our Lady. The seventh climb leads to the rooms where the tower guards dedicated to the fire watch used to be housed. South of this floor, sirens are visible that indicate the beginning of the holiday period. The Moon Clock is still working today.

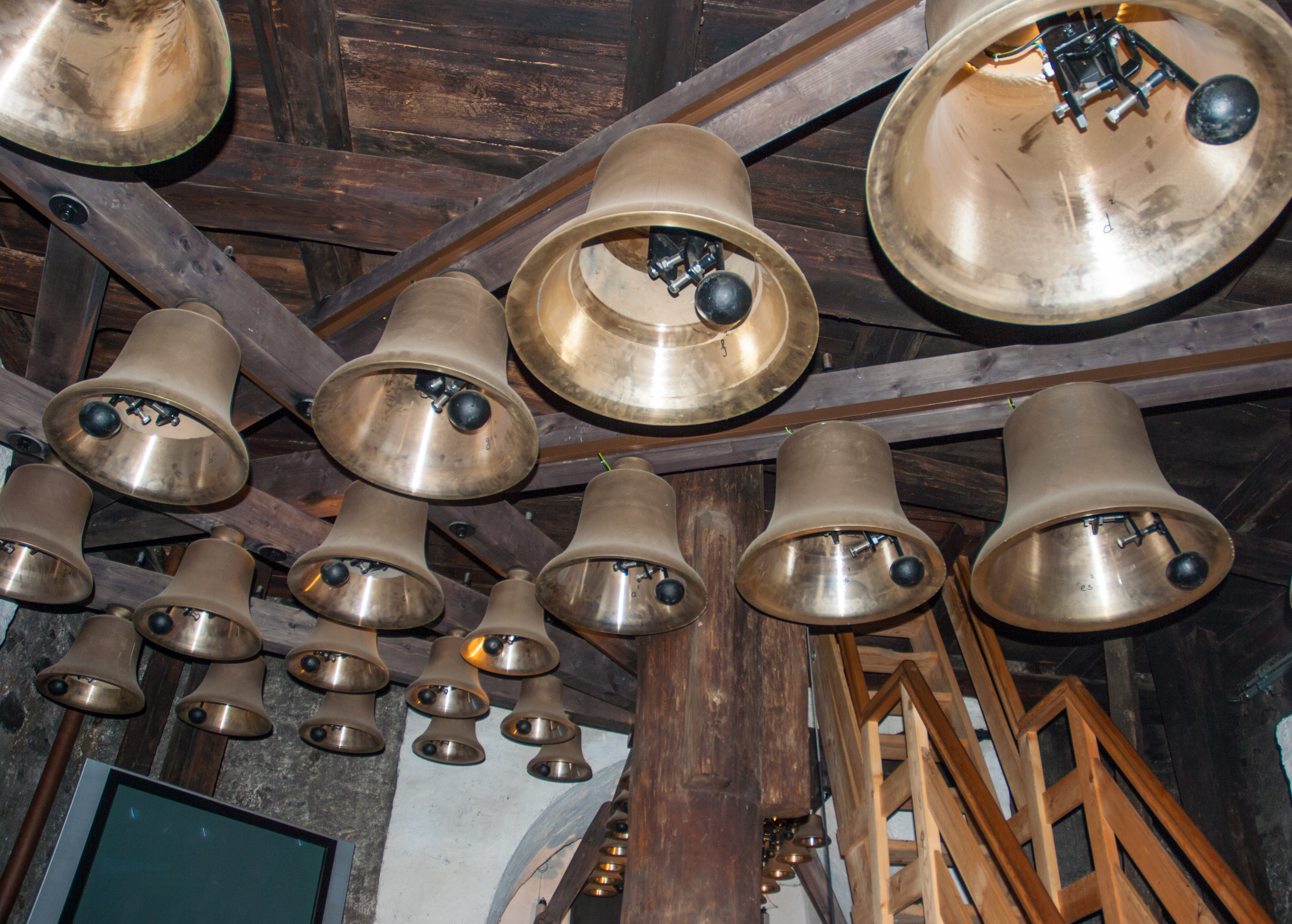
Bells of the White Tower.

=== The bells ===
Except for the death knell, all bells come from Luigi Colbacchini, who cast them in Trento in 1922. The death knell comes from the previous bell and was made by Chiappani in Trento in 1899. In the tower museum there are the rooms of the tower guard, the carillon made in 2007 with 43 bells from Holland as well as information about the tower and the town history. The bell system in the Brixen Cathedral as well as the one in the Parish Church of St. Michael is taken care of by the company Berger Kirchturmtechnik from Virgen (in East Tyrol). Both systems were equipped with new counter pendulum systems.

=== Guards of the "White Tower" ===
The "White Tower" embodies the connection between the spiritual and the secular city, more than the cathedral. The adjoining St. Michaels Gate with the typical polygonal bay window was the main access to the city of Brixen, at the junction between Brennerstrasse and Pustertaler Strasse, until the 17th century.

Because of its height, the "White Tower" was also the watchtower of the city for a long time. Until 1938, the tower guards kept an eye out for fire and other dangers from there. At about 40 meters of height, 26 wooden steps above the bell house, they had a chamber in a niche in the vaulted room there.

== Museum ==
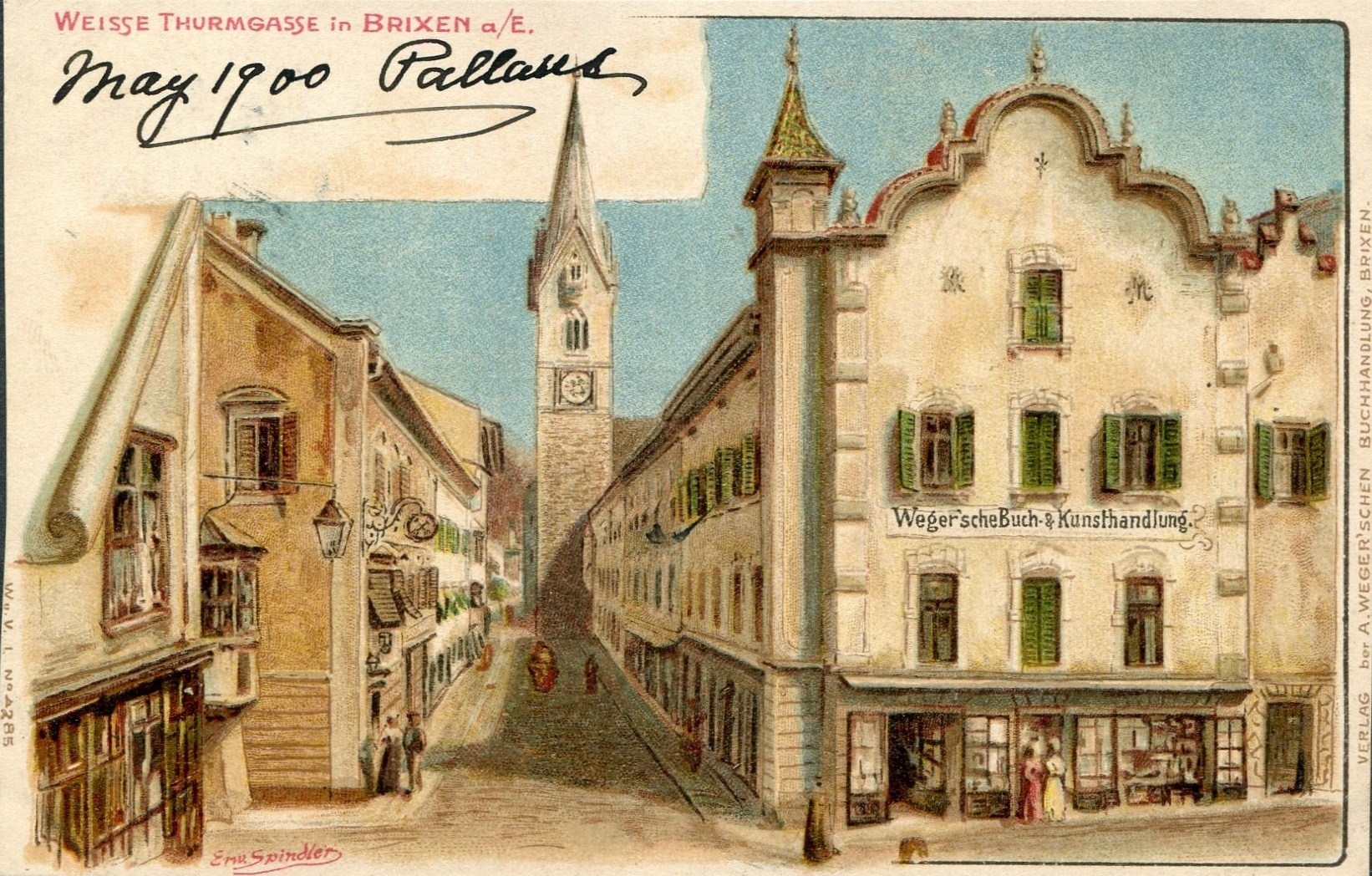
Historical postcard depicting the White Tower in Brixen.

The "White Tower" was opened to the public during the restoration in 2007 thanks to the suggestion of the pastor of Brixen Dean Leo Munter. The museum, which has had more than 6,000 visitors, shows the role and importance of the tower in the contemporary and past religious and civic life of the city. It is also possible to take a tour of the inside of the original globe of the Tower. The 43-bells carillon rings every day at 11.00 a.m. and attracts many tourists as well as locals. The different combinations of bells can play over a hundred tunes. On the top floor, there is a large roof with a table and chairs, where it is possible to observe the surrounding area. The Tower also has a lunar clock.

== Parish Church of Saint Michael in Brixen ==
The Church is accessible through Piazza Duomo. From the entryway the Statue of the Virgin Mary, the so called Pilgrim Madonna, stands out; in the early 1950s moving the statue from Church to Church during processions became a tradition. On the rear wall of the Church there is the painting depicting Saint Joseph Freinademetz, the Chinese missionary of Badiota origin, who was canonised by the Pope John Paul II on 5 October 2003 in Rome. On the opposite side of the nave there is the crucified Jesus Christ, standing next to the Mother of Sorrow, who is holding Her Son's dead body in Her arms. Here the believers use to collect the memories of the dead: the Virgin Mary is indeed believed to intercede between the relatives and their dead loved ones. On the side walls of the nave the fourteen stations of the Via Crucis are represented: this illustration is intended to be read by the believers as an exhortation to retrace the Christ crucifixion path.

=== First Parish Church of Saint Michael ===
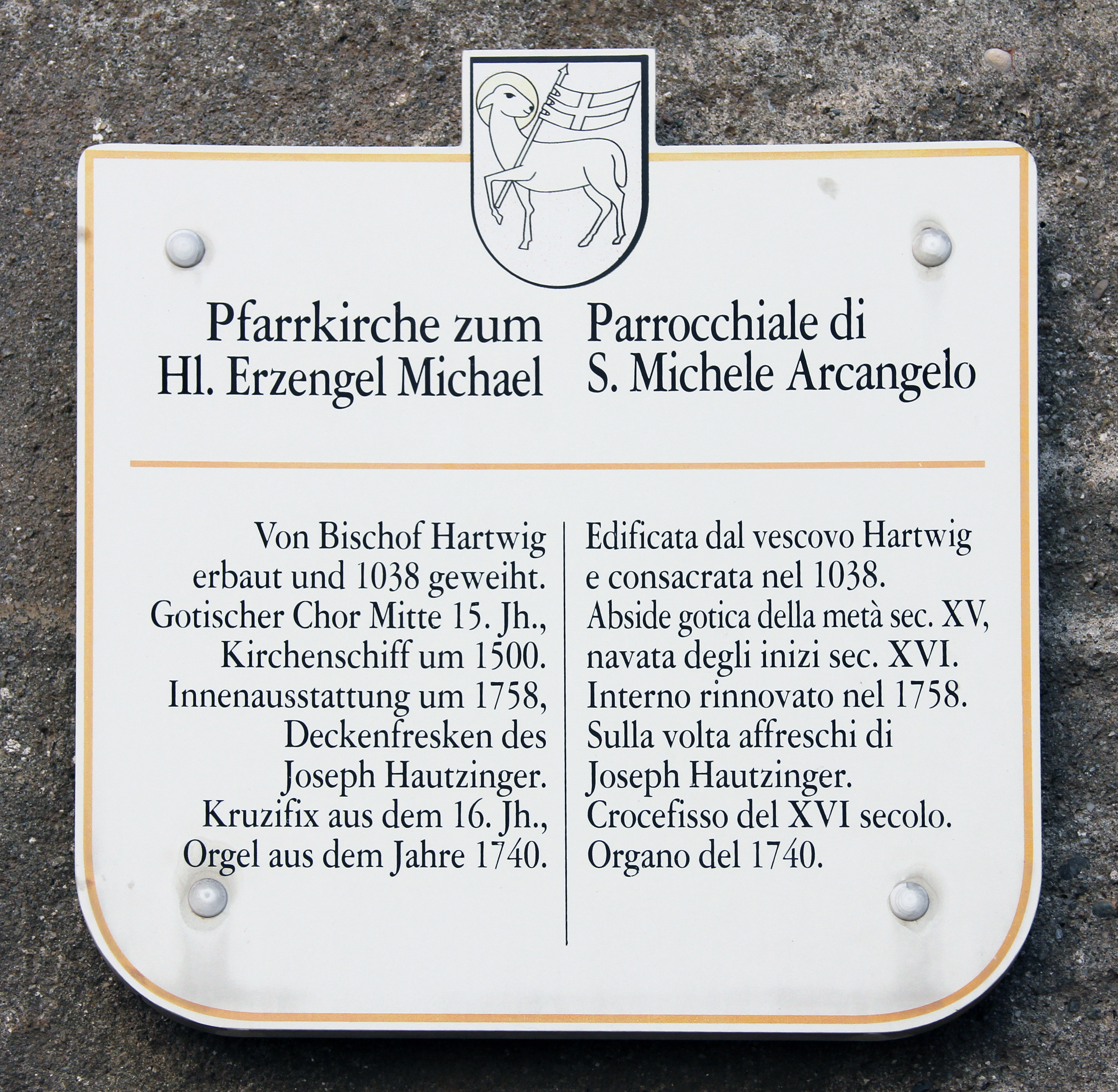
Memorial plaque of the Church of Saint Michael

The building prior to today's church of St. Michael the Archangel was consecrated in 1038 by Bishop Hartwig. This first church was a simple, square building with a round apse on the eastern side. It was a sacred architecture in the Ottonian style of the time. The dedication to the archangel Michael, who became the Patron of the Kingdom since the victory obtained in the battle against the Hungarians in Lechfeld in 955, also dates back to the Ottonian dynasty. The troops of Emperor Otto I had in fact fought under the banner of San Michele. The Byzantine princess Theophanu, consort of Otto II and influential mother of Otto III, continued to favor the veneration of the Archangel, a native of Eastern Greece. To her the Treasury of the Cathedral owes the so-called "Chasuble of Alboino", a purple liturgical garment made with a Byzantine silk fabric bearing the image of the imperial eagle, part of Theophane's dowry. The building after this first church was later erected in the Gothic style and today still retains the appearance of the past: a late-Gothic construction built of granite blocks with pointed arched windows. The interior, on the other hand, has radically changed its face: in 1757/58 it was rebuilt in a Baroque style. Joseph Hautzinger, coming from Vienna, who had already worked in the Cathedral, created the frescoes that currently adorn the vaults of the nave.

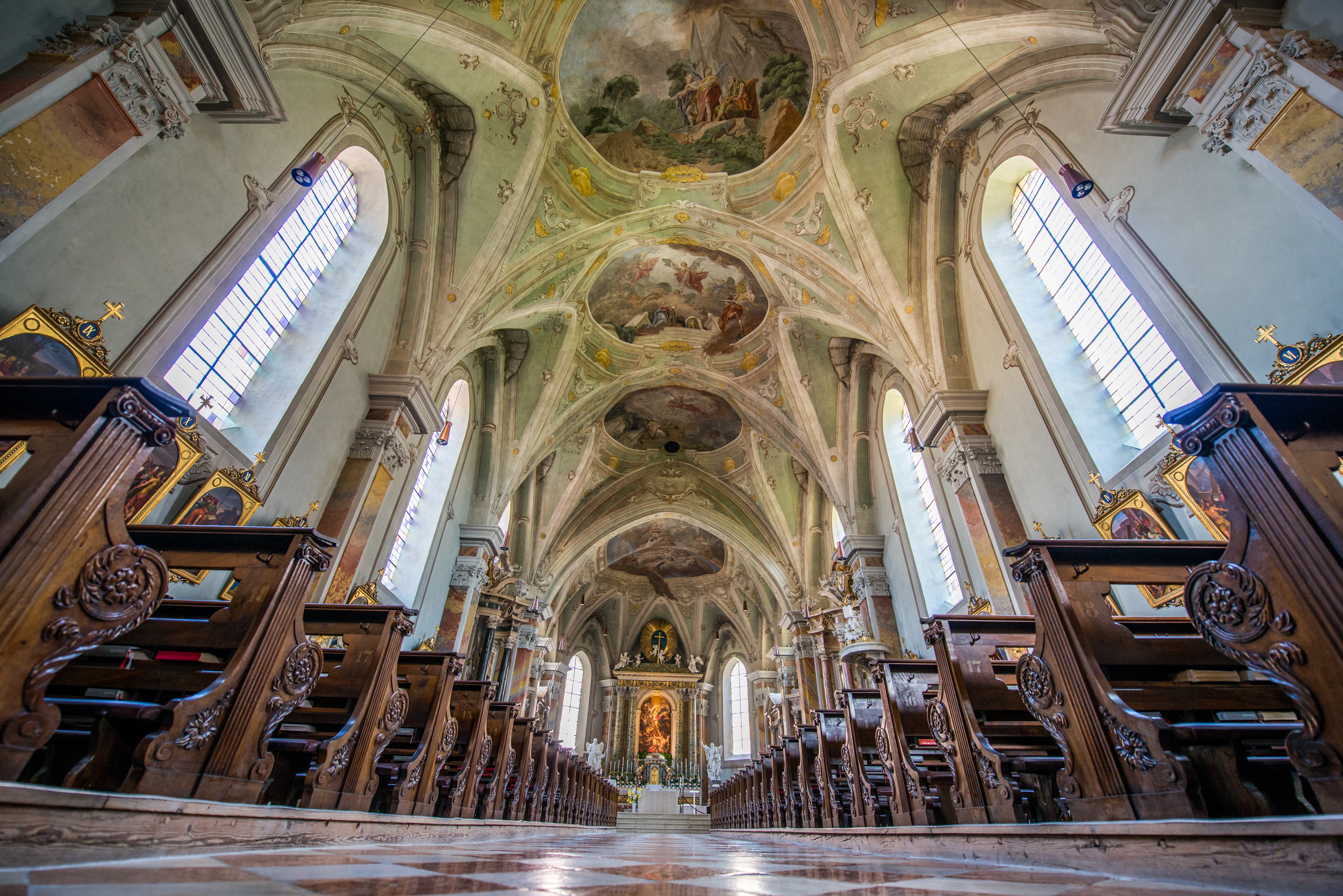
The nave of the Parish Church of Saint Michael in Brixen, looking towards the choir.

=== Renovation works ===
The church was built as a late Gothic hall church around 1500 and was consecrated in 1503. It stands on the site of a previous Ottonian building, a Romanesque church from the 16th century, consecrated by Bishop Hartwig in 1038. The polygonal end of the choir faces east. The lower part of the adjoining tower was built around 1300, while the characteristic upper part with small oriels, pointed-arch sound windows and pointed helmet was built in 1459. The interior of the church was redesigned in Baroque style around 1750. The ceiling frescoes were painted by Josef Hauzinger, a pupil of Paul Troger from Vienna, in the year 1757. The high altar painting, which depicts Michael's fight with Lucifer, was created by Andrea Pozzo. The flanking angel sculptures by Johann Perger. The rest of the furnishings, with the high altar and side altars, are baroque, classicist and romantic. The expressive wooden figure of Christ and Simon of Cyrene carrying the cross is from the 15th century. The church has been a listed building since 1984. The church is well known for its bell tower also known as the White Tower. For example, under the Austrian coat of arms with the year 1459, it says that "Nicholas of Cusa really saw me perfect." In 1677, next to the episcopal coat of arms, the ensign reads "Since Bishop Paulin rules I am renovated again."

=== Artwork of the church ===
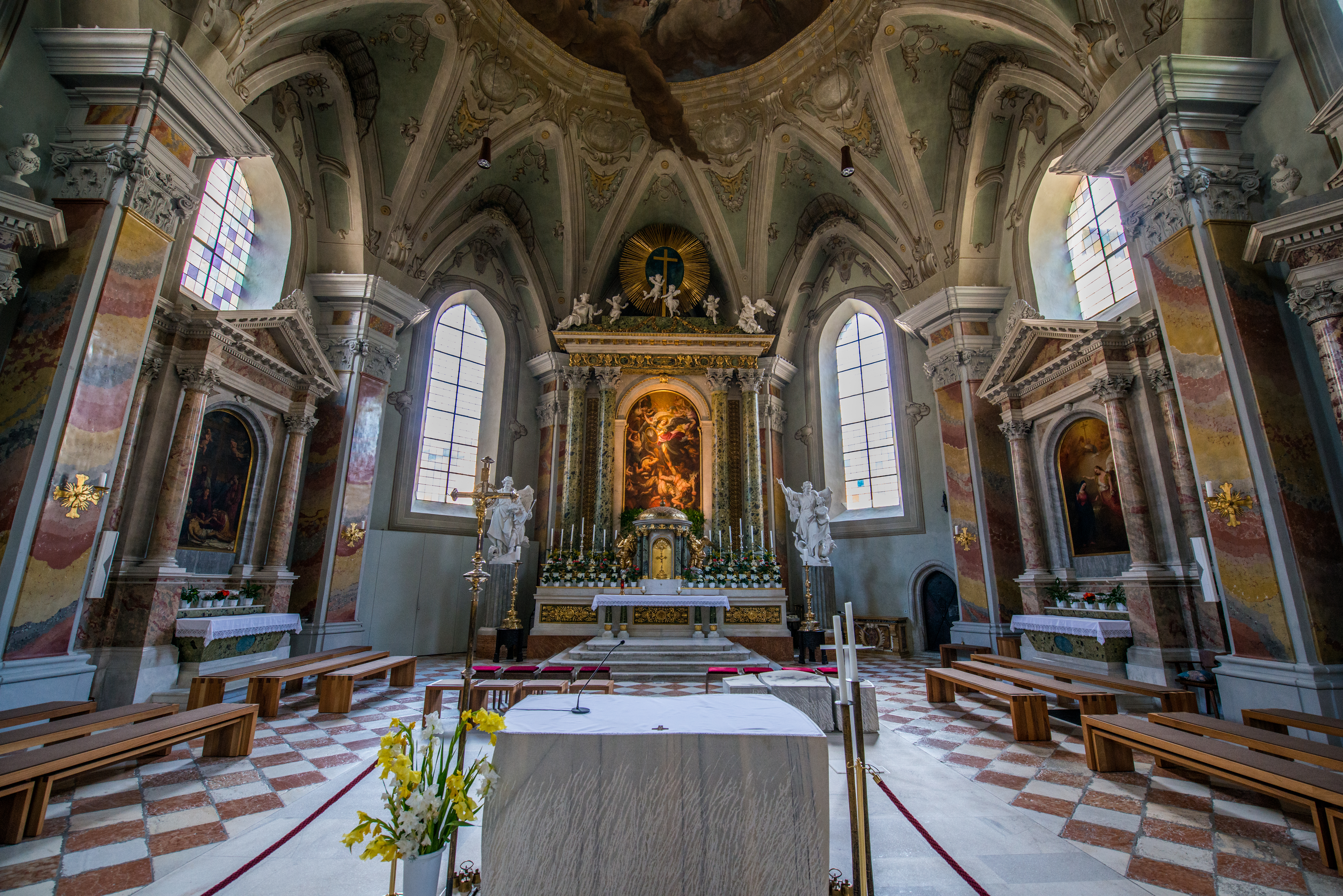
Apse of the Parish Church of Saint Michael

The frescoes of the side altars represent Biblical scenes: the Annunciation, the adoration of Magi, the crucifixion and deposition of Jesus. Above the presbytery and the high altar there is the adoration of the Holy Trinity by part of the choir of angels and a group of venerated saints: Cassiano, Sebastiano, Giuseppe, Luigi, Floriano, Giovanni Nepomuceno, Vittorio e Urban. The canvas above the high altar, work of Andrea Pozzo, represent the saint Archangel Michael in his fight against Lucifer and his allies; the contemplation of the imposing representation is usually associated to a prayer, adapted from the hymn of Lauds on the feast of St. Michael; St. Michael, who fought for the glory of God, Angel of peace, annihilated all wars and misfortune, defends the Church and protects the Redeemed from all evils. The two great statutes of the archangel Raphael with Tobias and a Guardian Angel with a child, on the sides of the altar, along with other representations of Angels, illustrate the Christianity of the building. Perpetual light recalls Eucharistic permanence of Jesus in the tabernacle; the adoring angels are an invitation to remain close to Jesus, whose presence represents the divine answer to the supplication of travelers of Emmaus: "Lord, stay with us". Jesus, the Savior risen from the dead, is always present. Not only the ministers of the liturgy, but also the parents with their children and young people will find a place in the renovated presbytery.

== Curiosity ==
In 1956, during the elections of the City Council, the SVP, also known in Italian as "Partito Popolare Sudtirolese", had a major competitor in the movement called "White Tower", a party that took its name from the Tower, symbol of the city of Brixen. The party summarized the program in two words: Faith and work. The program of the list, which was distributed on leaflets, spoke of Christian values, but was generally formulated vaguely. In addition, the "White Tower List" turned against the "unchristian nationalism" of the "secret SVP district chairman" Hans Stanek.

== Bibliography ==
Publications about the White Tower (Brixen) include:

- Hannes Obermair, Regionale Zivilgesellschaft in Bewegung / Cittadini innanzi tutto: Festschrift für Hans Heiss, 2012. ISBN 978-3852566184. Publisher: Folio Verlagsges.

== Gallery ==
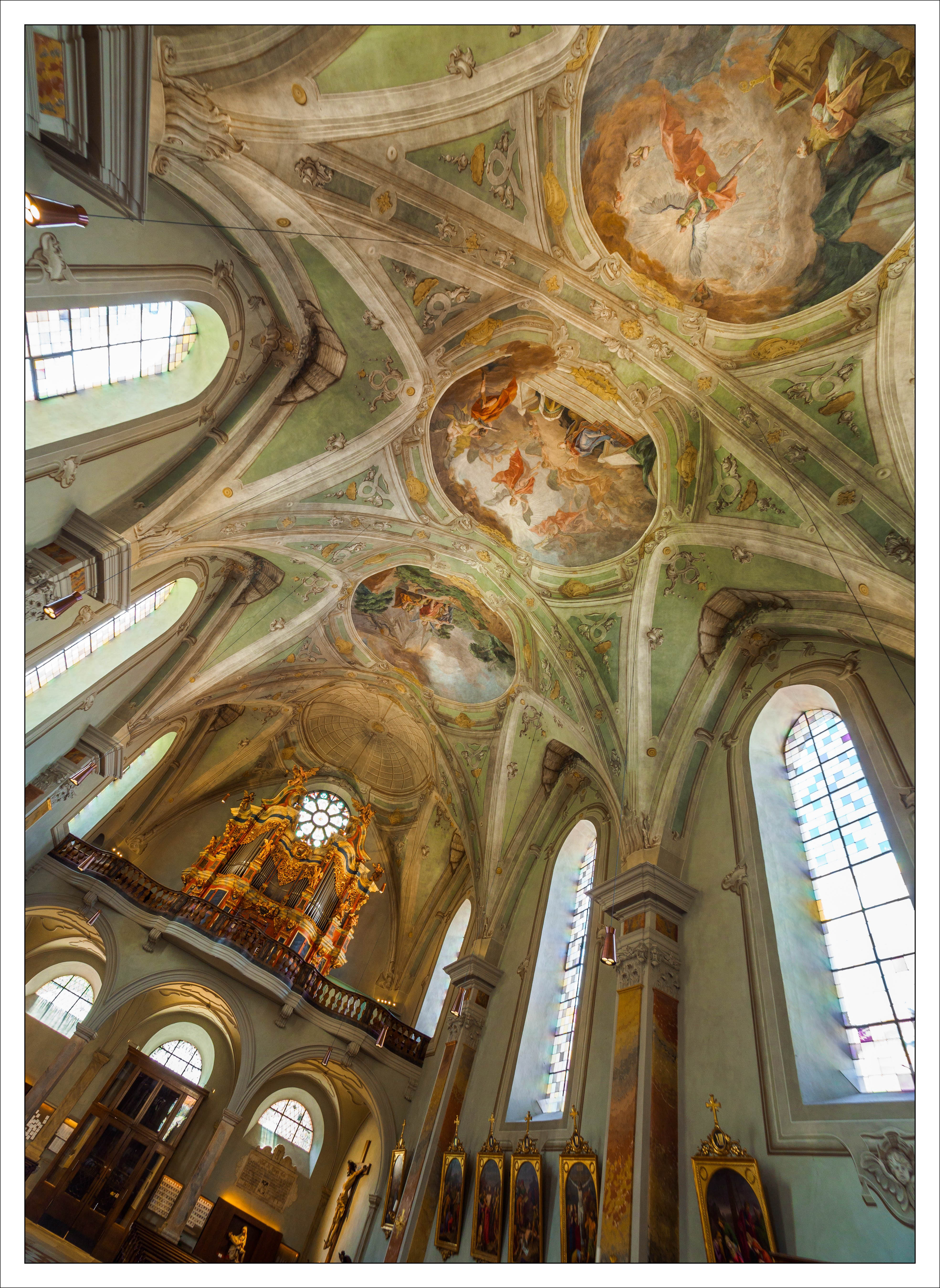
Interiors of the Parish Church of Brixen.

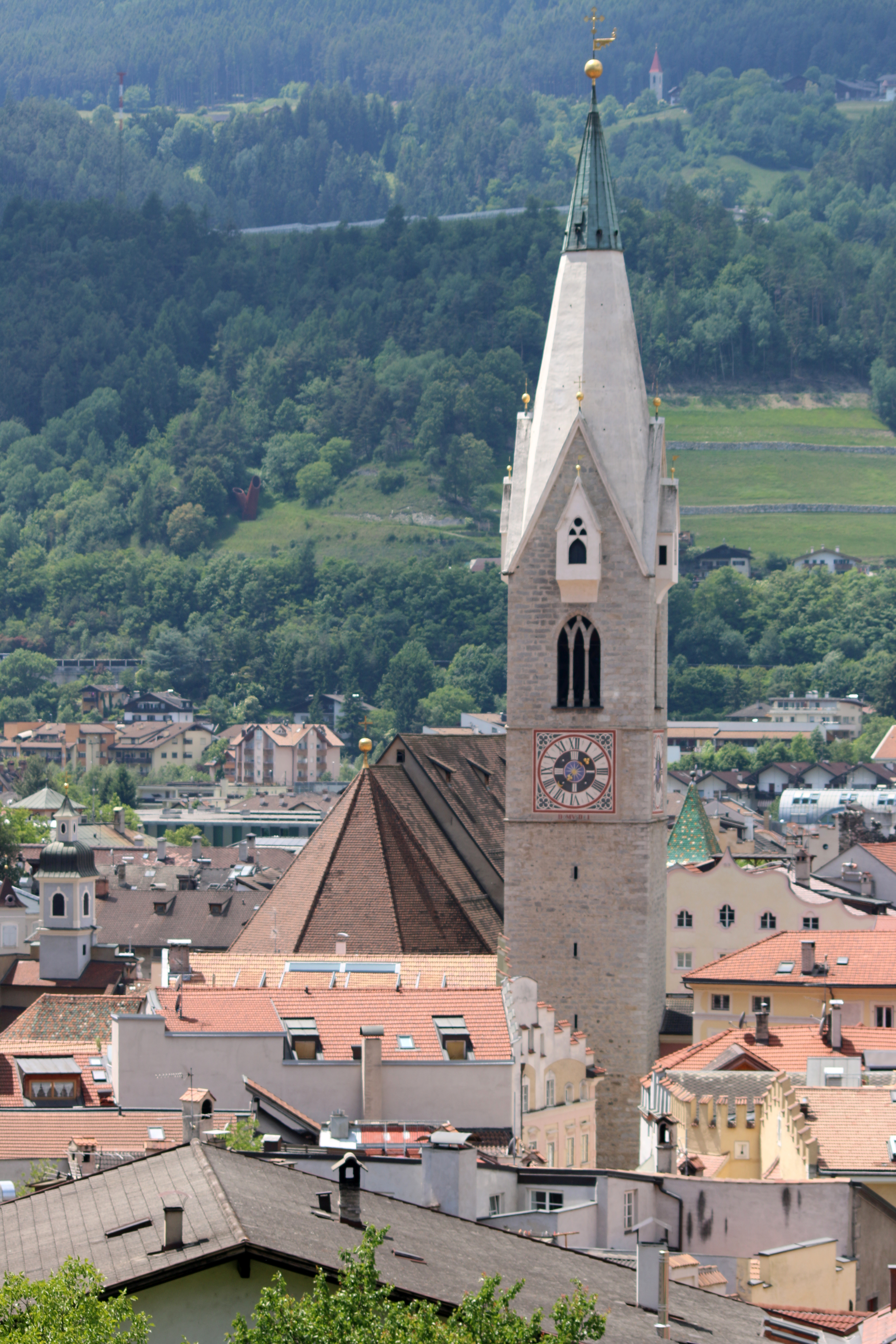
View of the characteristic White Tower .

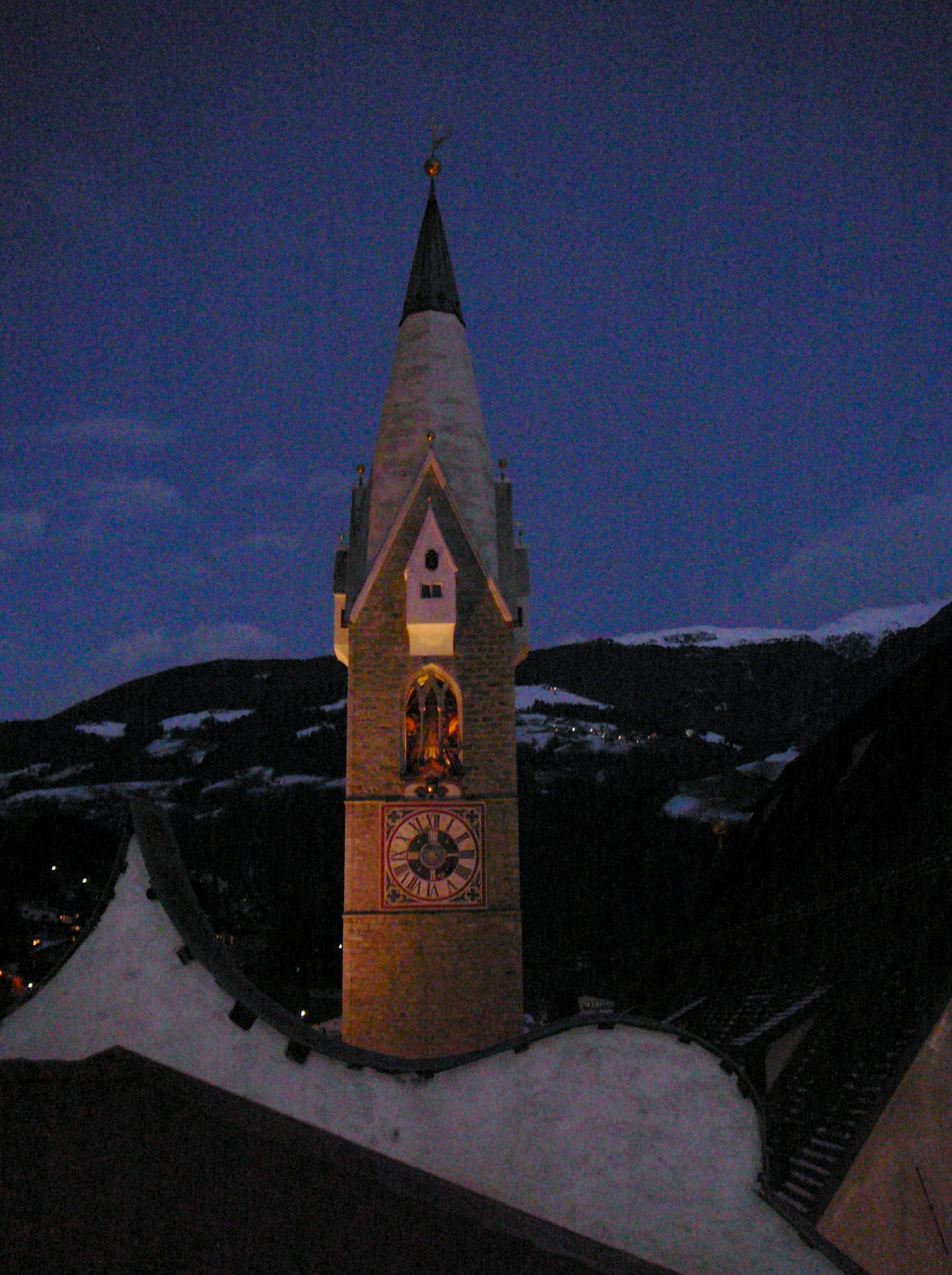
The White Tower in Brixen.

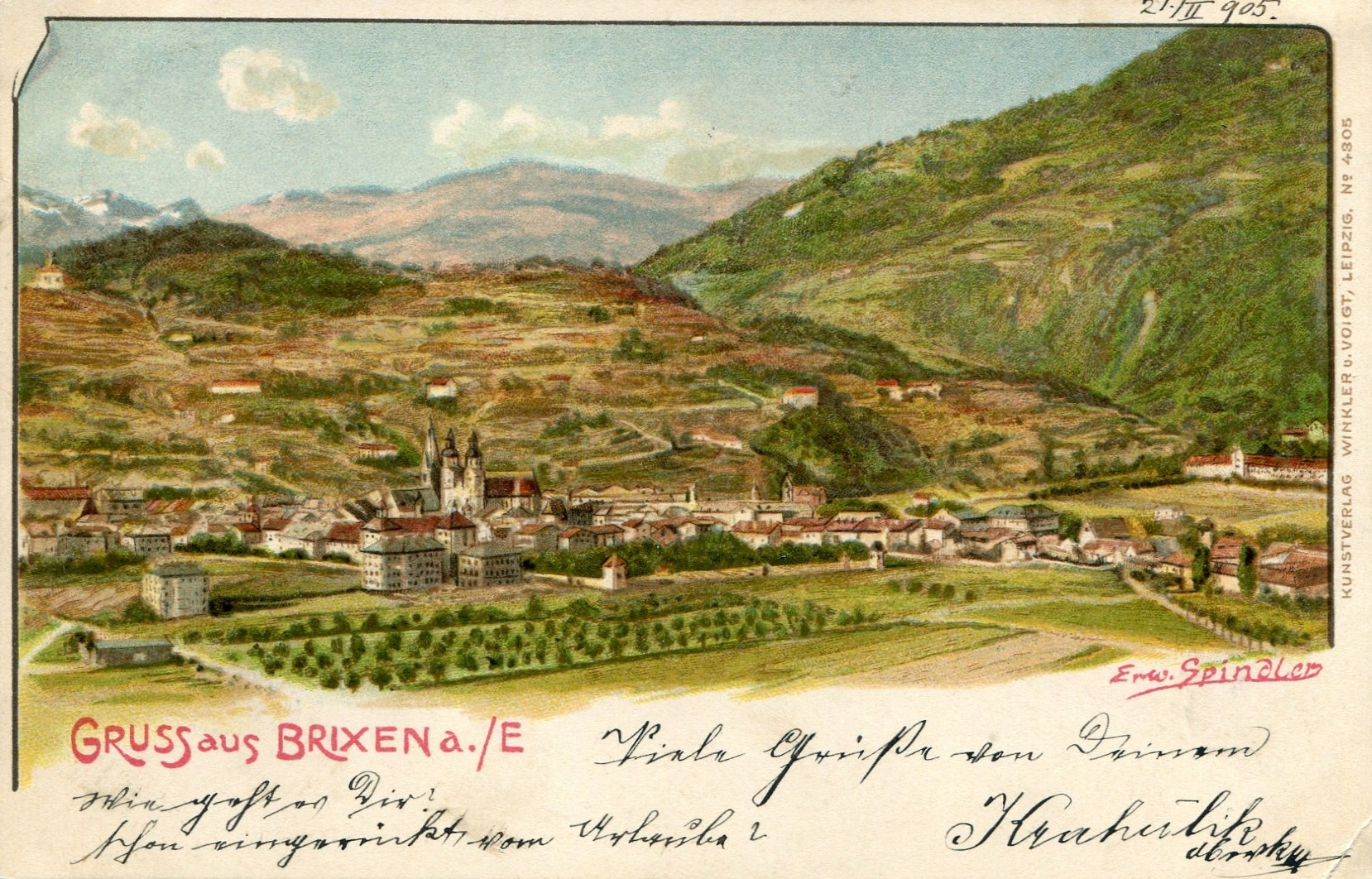
Historical postcard of Brixen dated between 1860 and 1928

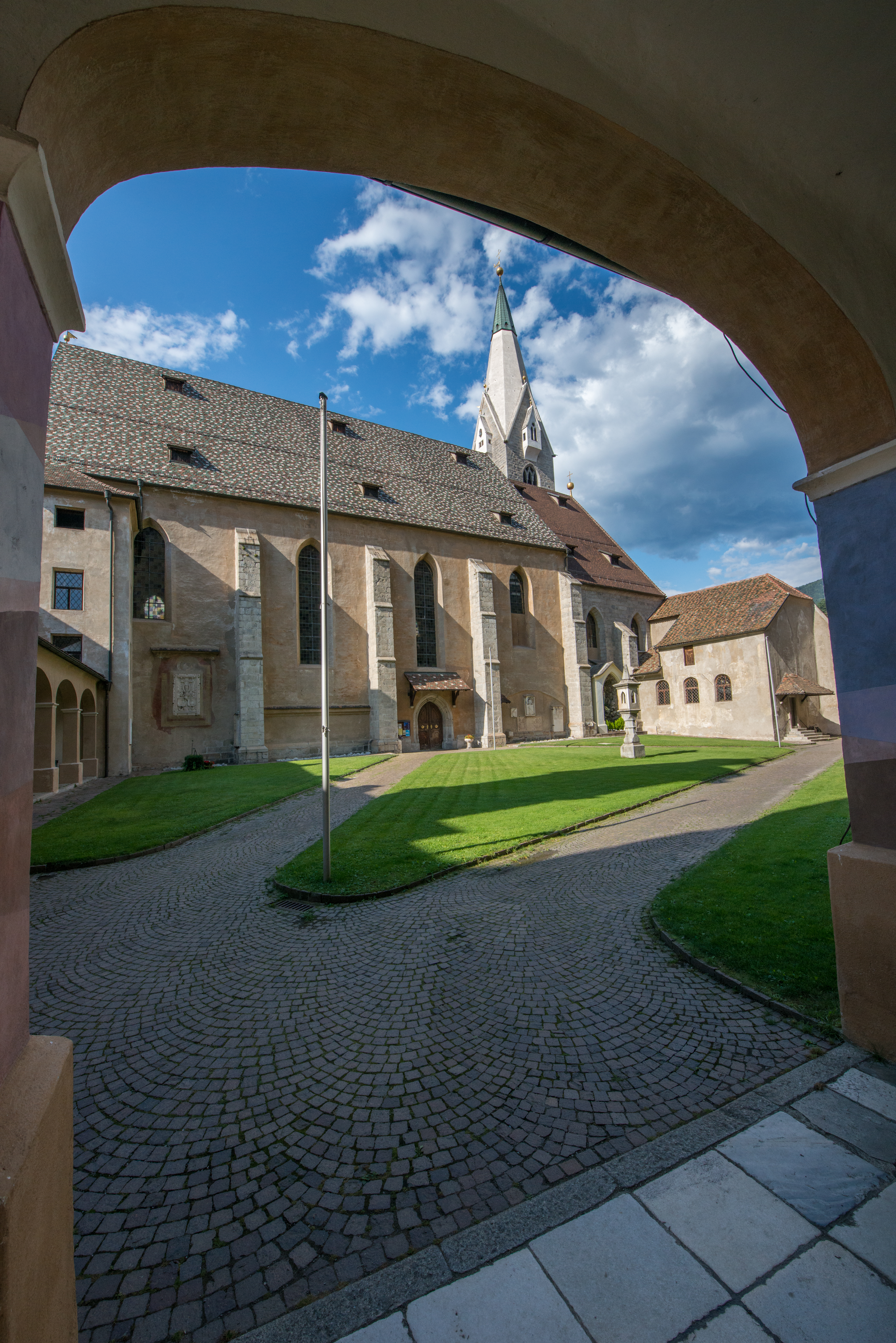
View of the White Tower and Parrish Church from the cloister

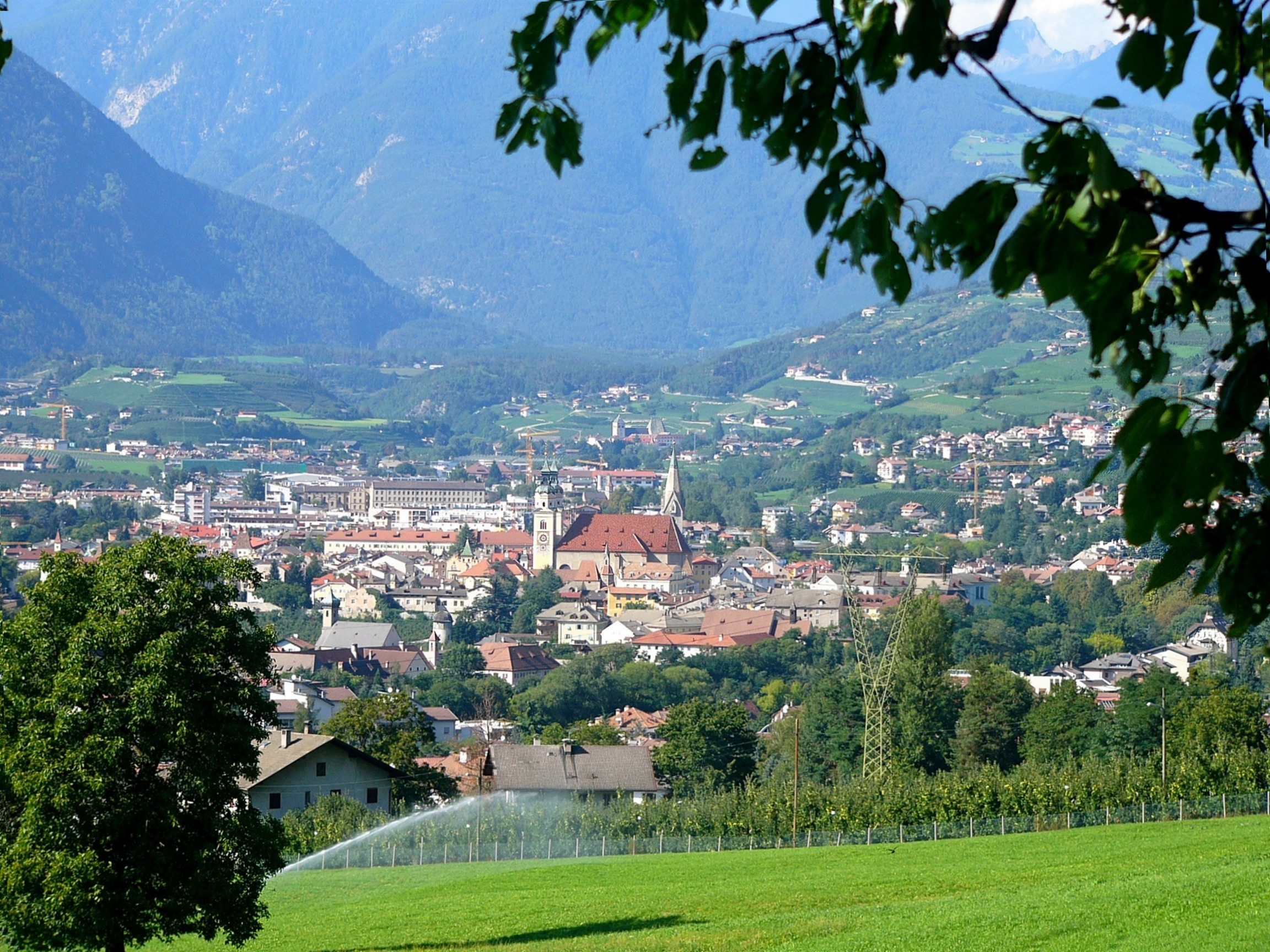
View of Brixen with its Dome and the White Tower.

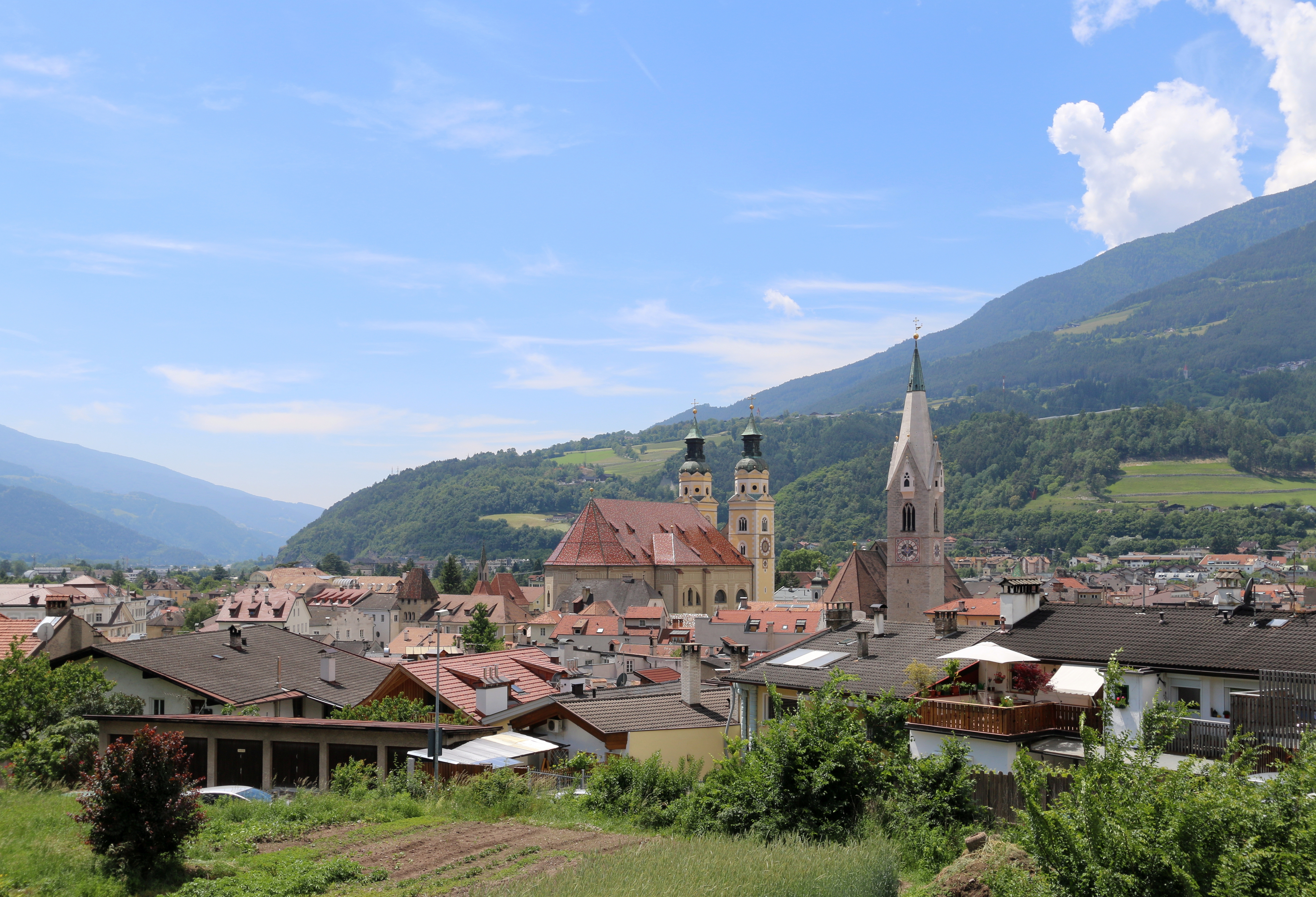
View of Brixen with the Dome and the White Tower.

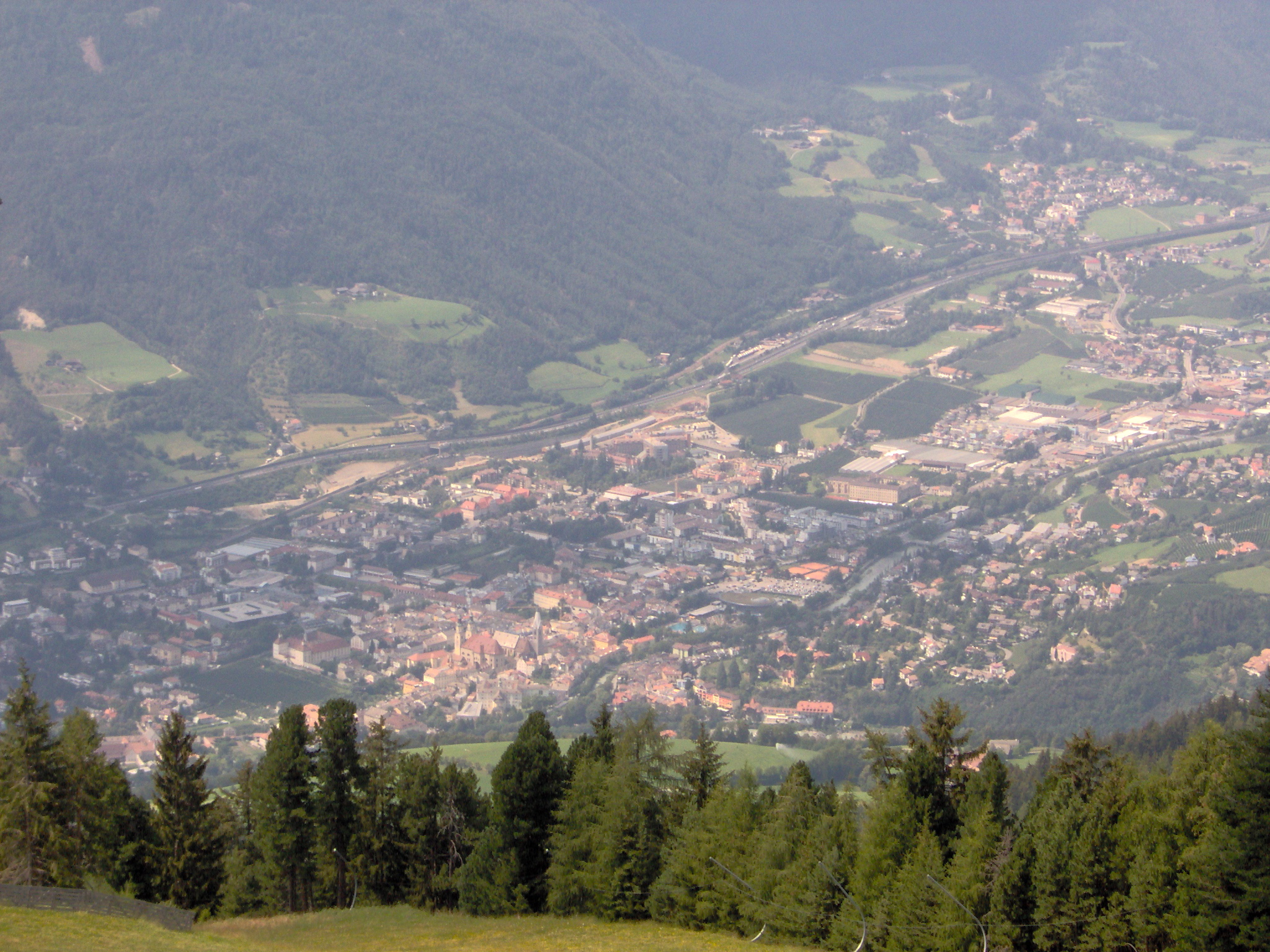
View of the city of Brixen and the Isarco Valley

== See also ==
- Valle Isarco
- Strada Statale 12 dell'Abertone e del Brennero
- South Tyrolean People's Party
- Tourism in Brixen
