= Paul Troger =

Austrian painter, draughtsman and printmaker

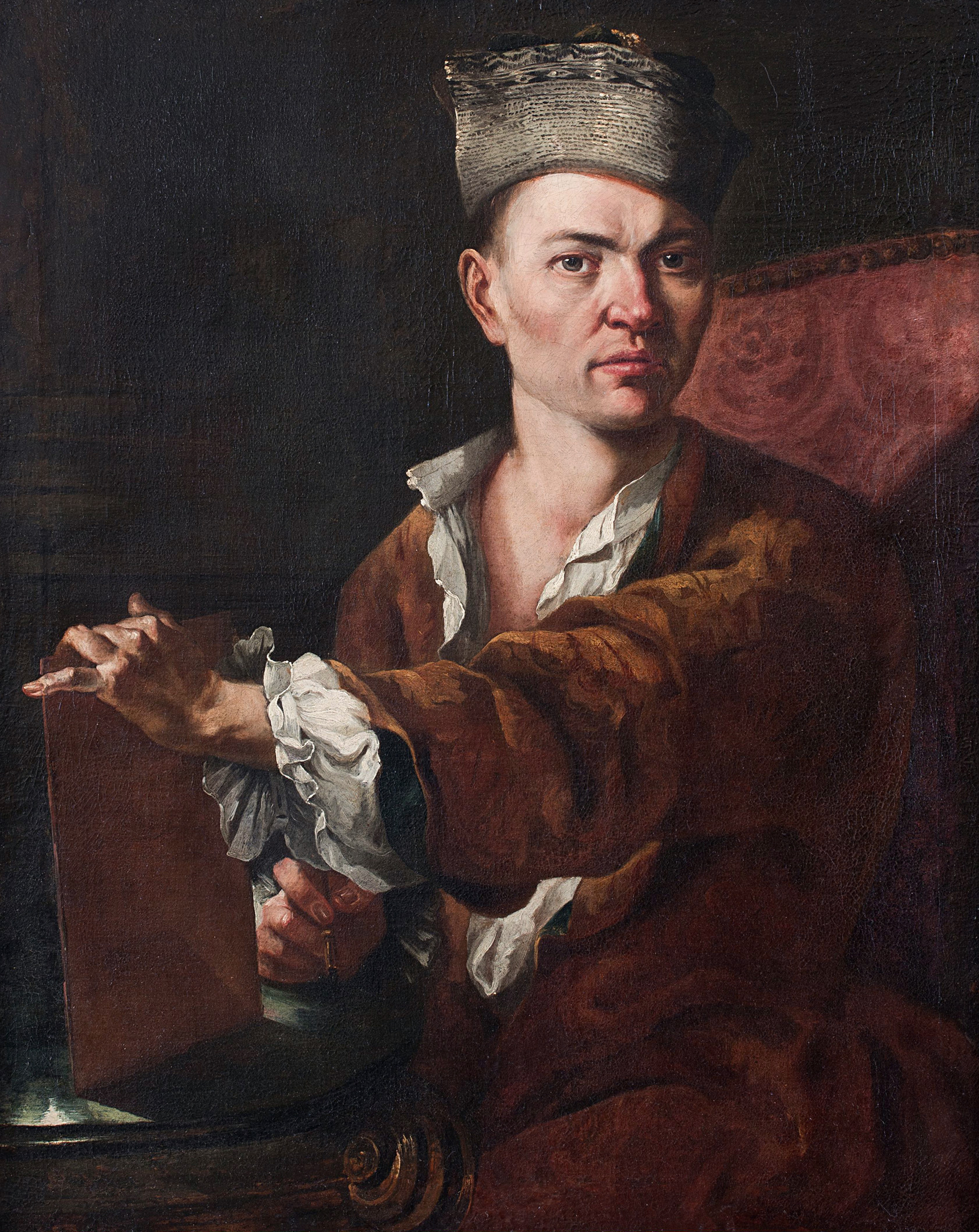
- Self portrait at the age of 30
- Born: 30 October 1698; Welsberg, Tyrol
- Died: 20 July 1762 (aged 63); Vienna
- Education: Giuseppe Alberti, Sebastiano Ricci and Francesco Solimena
- Known for: Painting
- Notable work: Frescoes in Altenburg, Melk and Göttweig Abbeys
- Movement: Baroque

Paul Troger (30 October 1698 – 20 July 1762) was an Austrian painter, draughtsman, and printmaker of the late Baroque period. Troger's illusionistic ceiling paintings in fresco are notable for their dramatic vitality of movement and their palette of light colors.

Paul Troger’s style, particularly in his frescoes, dominated Austrian painting until the end of the 18th century and profoundly influenced significant artists of the next generation, notably Franz Anton Maulbertsch, Josef Ignaz Mildorfer, Johann Wenzel Bergl and Johann Lucas Kracker.

== Life ==
Paul Troger was born on 30 October 1698 in Welsberg, in the Puster Valley of the County of Tyrol. At the age of 16, under the patronage of the aristocratic Tyrolean von Firmian family, he visited Fiume and became a pupil of Giuseppe Alberti. He painted his first fresco “Three Angels with the Cross and Putti”, in the Kalvarienkirche, Kaltern (1722).

In 1722, the prince-bishop of Gurk sent Paul Troger to Venice, where he discovered the works of Giovanni Battista Piazzetta, and Giovanni Battista Pittoni. Troger also studied in Rome with Sebastiano Ricci, in Naples with Francesco Solimena and in Bologna, the leading artistic centers of Italy at the time. On his return to Austria, Troger first worked in Salzburg from 1726 to 1728, where he painted the "Glory of Saint Cajetan" on the ceiling of St. Cajetan’s Church, Salzburg (1728). He afterwards established himself in Vienna, where the art of ceiling frescoes was, however, dominated by Johann Michael Rottmayr and Daniel Gran.

Paul Troger became the favourite fresco painter in Lower Austrian monasteries in collaboration with the architect Josef Munggenast. In 1753, he joined the Imperial Academy of Fine Arts. Troger became professor and was made director of the Imperial Academy in 1754. His most prominent student was Franz Anton Maulbertsch. His most important contribution to Austrian painting was to reject the strong dark palette, typical of the beginning of the 18th century, in favor of an increasingly lighter palette, typical of the new Rococo taste.

== Works ==
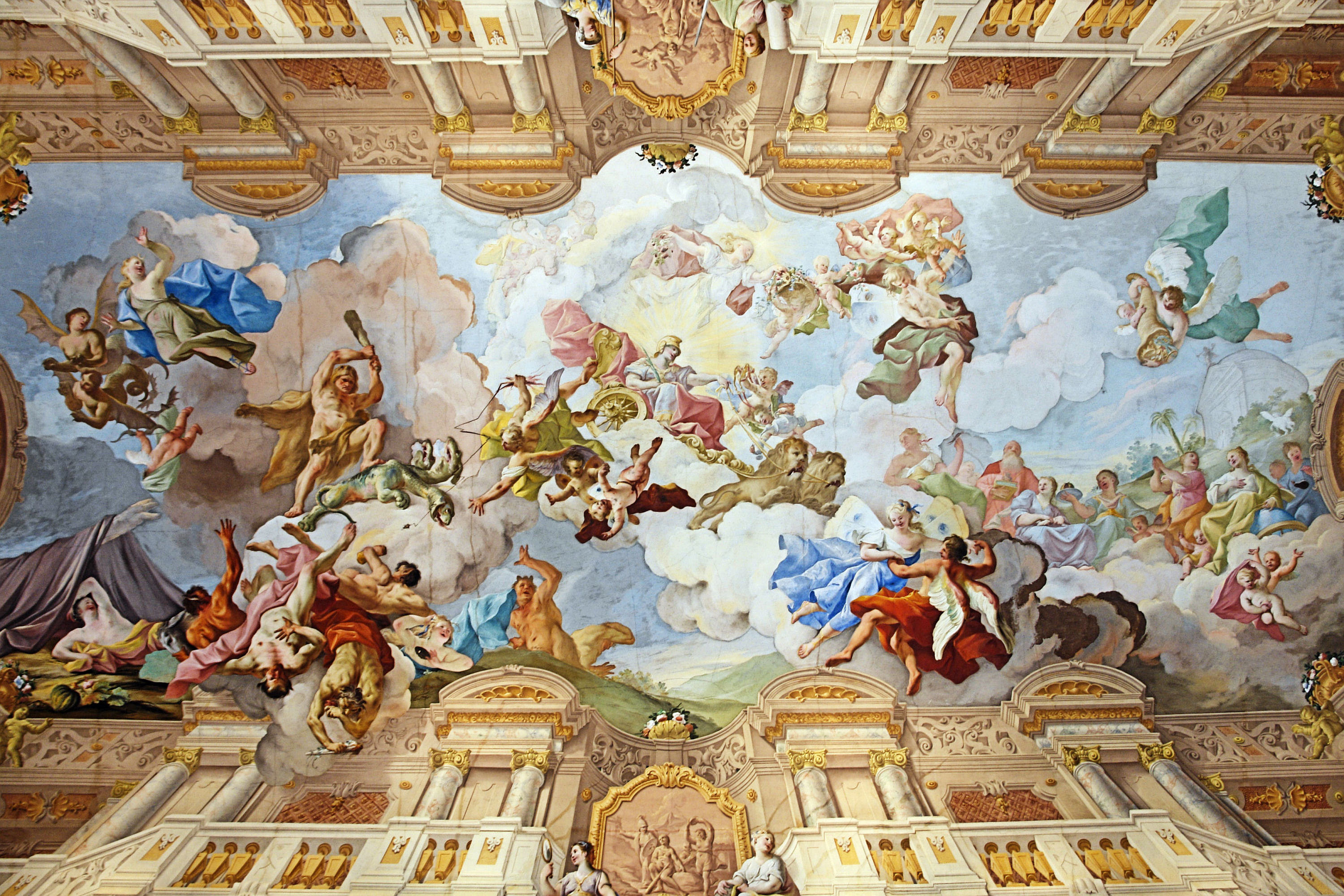
Ceiling painting of the Marble Hall, Melk Abbey (1731)

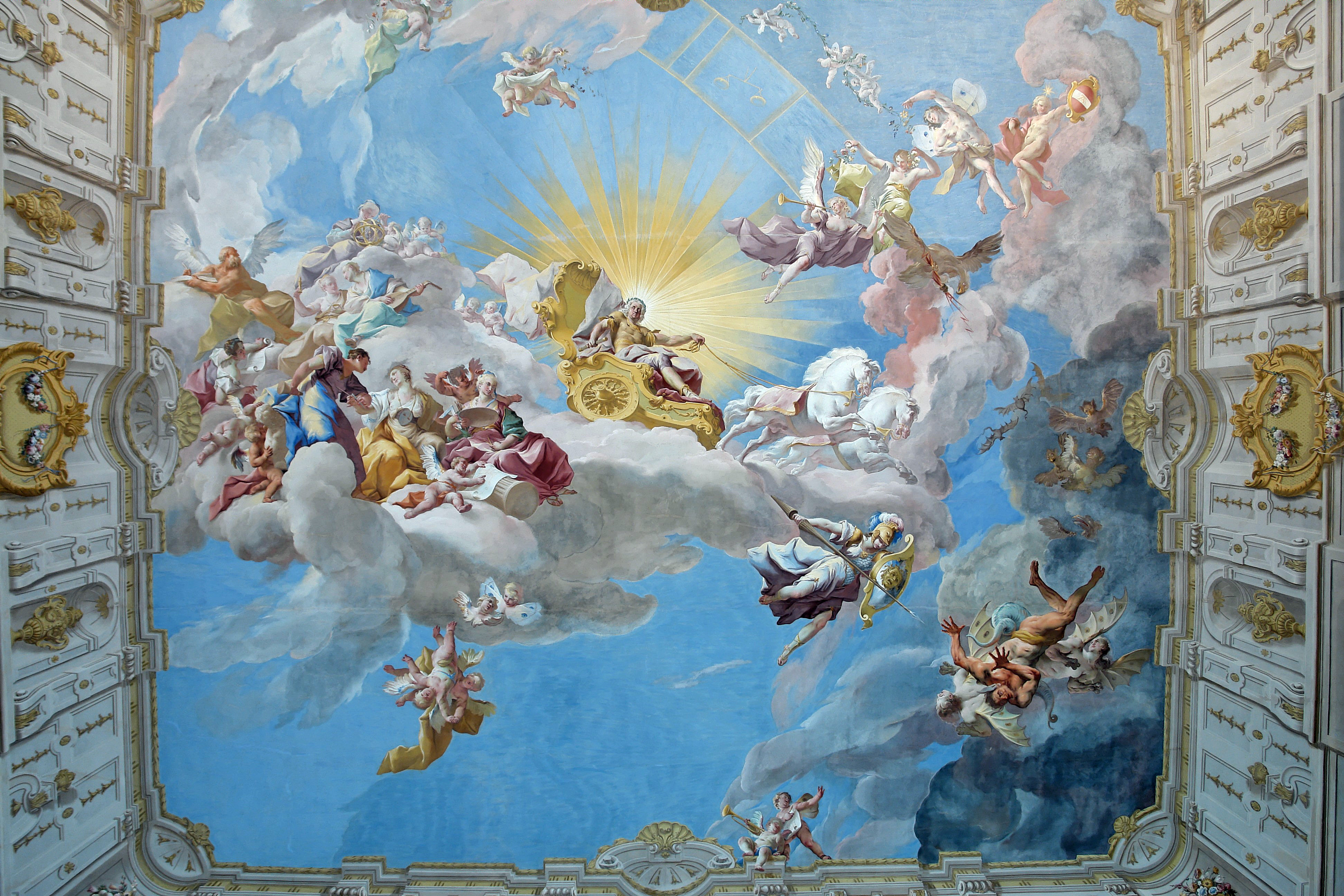
Apotheosis of Charles VI for the Imperial staircase, Göttweig Abbey (1739)

Although he did many easel altar paintings and drawings, Paul Troger became famous for his frescoes and much in demand throughout the Austrian lands. Troger's frescoes are remarkable for their immense vitality of movement and their light colors. Noteworthy among them are the following ceiling paintings:

- Frescoes of the Church of the Englische Fräulein in St. Pölten, (1729/1730);
- Frescoes in large monastic buildings of Austria:
  - Melk Abbey
    - Marble Hall and the library (1732–1733)
  - Göttweig Abbey
    - Apotheosis of Charles VI as Apollo over the main stairway (1739)
  - Altenburg Abbey
    - Church, stairwell and library (1732–1734)
  - Zwettl Abbey (1733);
  - Seitenstetten Abbey
    - Marble hall (1735) and library (1740)
  - Geras Abbey
    - Marble hall (1738)
- Frescoes for the church of nuns of the Order of Elizabeth, in Bratislava (1740s)
- Apotheosis of Saint Ignatius in St. Ignatius’ church in Győr, Hungary (1744; 1747)
- Adoration of the Lamb in Brixen Cathedral with the connected White Tower, Italy (1748–1750)
- Vision of St. Ulrich at the Battle of Lechfeld, St Ulrich, Vienna, main altar (1750)
- Dome of the pilgrimage church of Maria Dreieichen near Vienna (1752)
