= Palazzo Leoni Montanari =

Building in Vicenza, Italy

Coordinates: 45.5501°N 11.5470°E

The Palazzo Leoni Montanari is a late Baroque palace located in Contra’ San Corona number 25 in central Vicenza in the Veneto region of Italy. It now houses exhibition rooms, meeting places, and art collections owned by the bank, Intesa Sanpaolo.

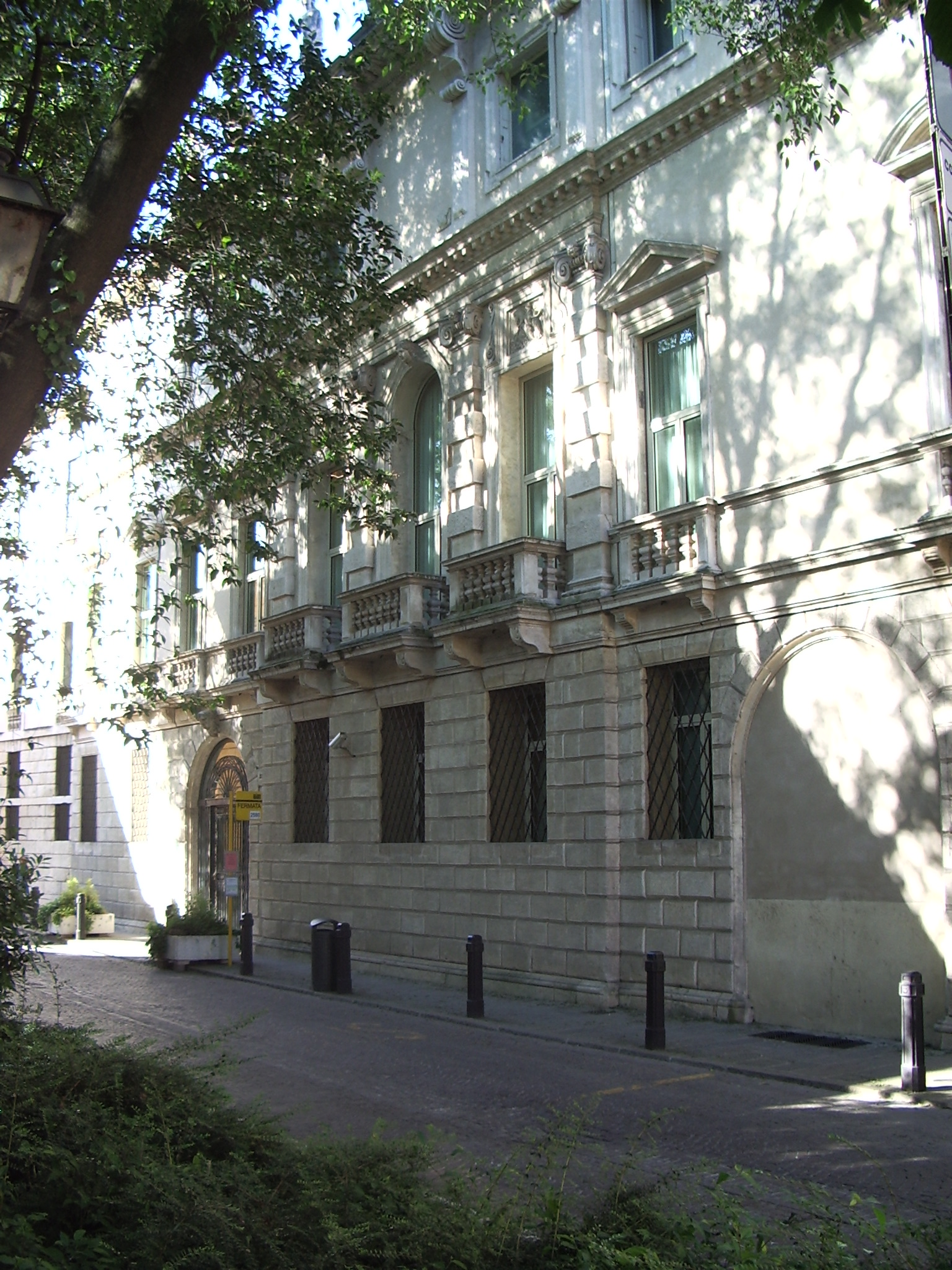
Facade

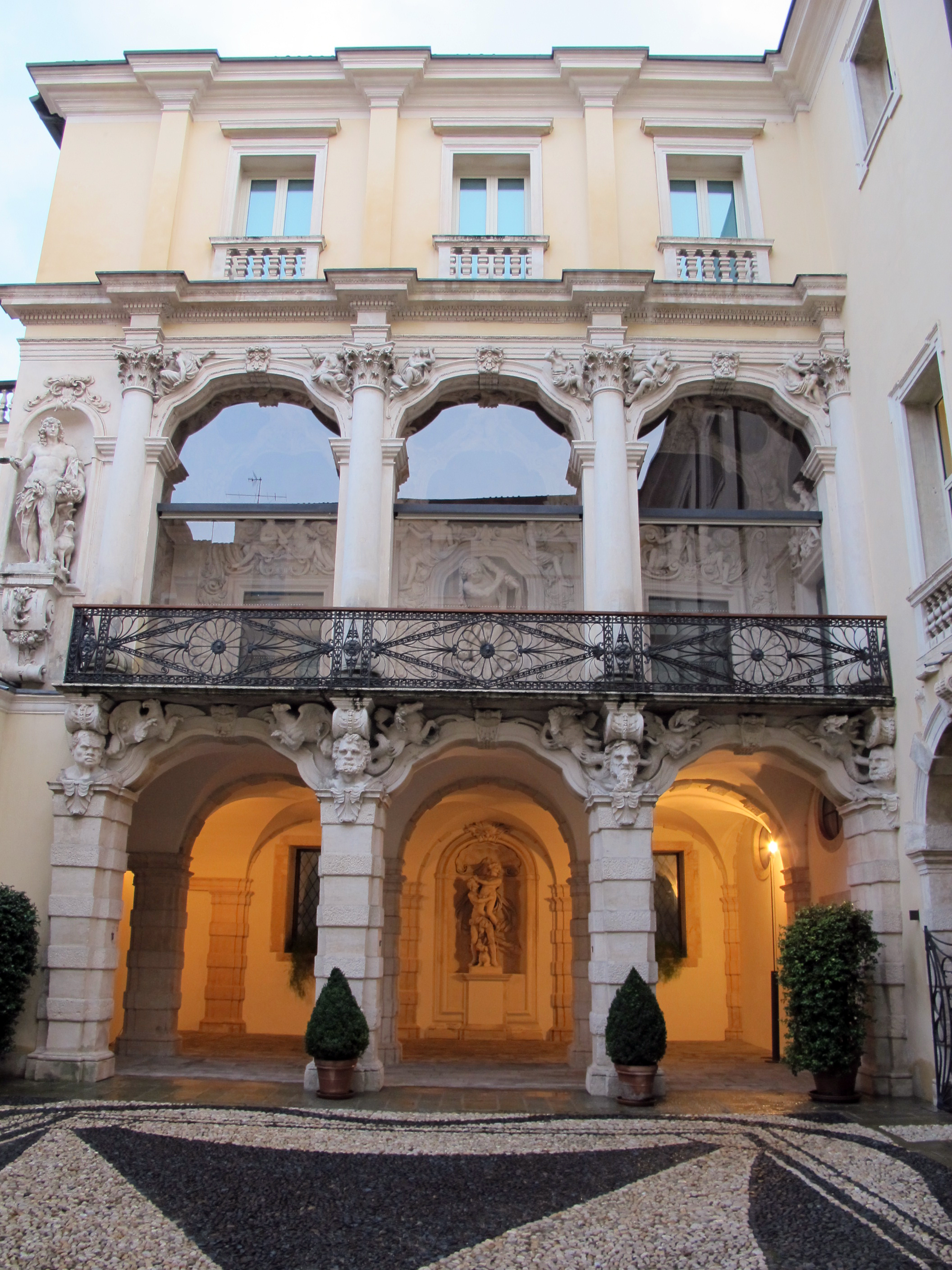
Interior courtyard

== History ==
Construction was commissioned in 1678 by Giovanni Leoni Montanari, a wealthy merchant in fabrics who aspired to enter the nobility. The architects are unknown, but the Borrella firm from Vicenza and the Lombard architect Giuseppe Marchi are implicated in its design.

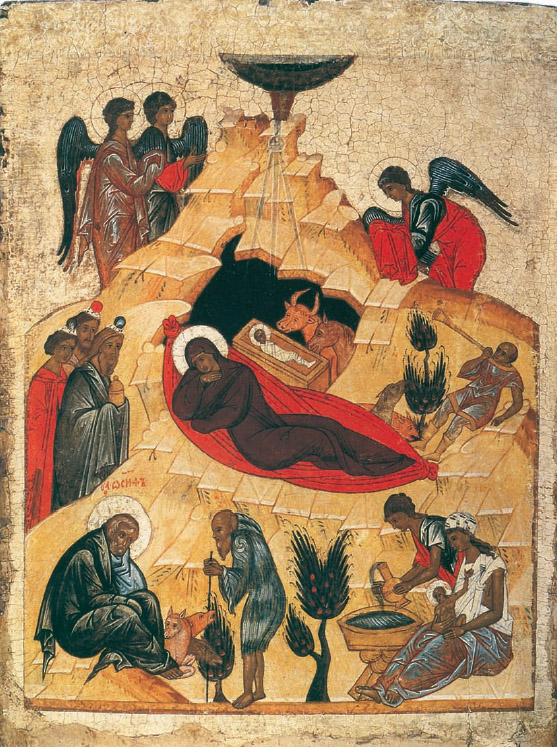
Icon of the Nativity.

The interior decoration recruited the Lombardese Paracca family as stucco workers and painters, the Tyrolese painter Giuseppe Alberti, the French painter Louis Dorigny, and the Bassanese sculptor Angelo Marinali.

In 1808, the palace was bought by Count Girolamo Egidio di Velo, an amateur collector of Greek and Roman antiques. The main floor was redecorated with stuccos and frescos in the neoclassical style. By 1908, the palace was the property of a bank. During the late 1970s, the palace underwent restoration.

The art galleries of the museum contain a select collection of Russian icons and paintings mainly by Venetian-trained artists of the 18th century, such as Francesco Albotto, Canaletto, Carlevarijs, the brothers Francesco and Giacomo Guardi, Pietro Longhi, Bartolomeo Pedon, Giovanni Antonio Pellegrini, the studio of Marco Ricci, Francesco Zuccarelli, and father and son: Giovanni Battista and Gian Domenico Tiepolo.
