= Johann Lucas Kracker =

Austrian-Czech painter (1717–1779)

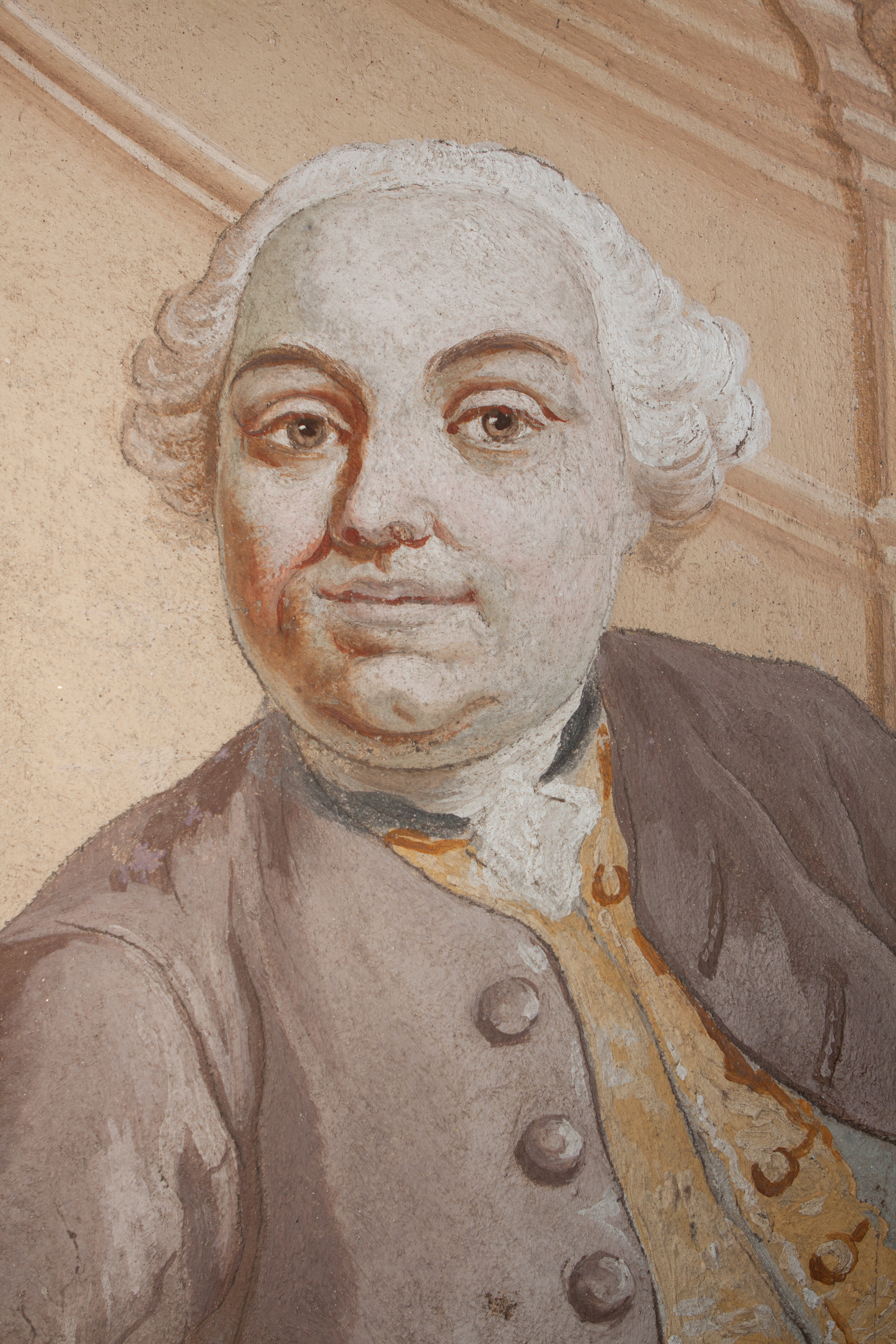
Self-portrait in a mural at the Abbey of Nová Říše (1766)

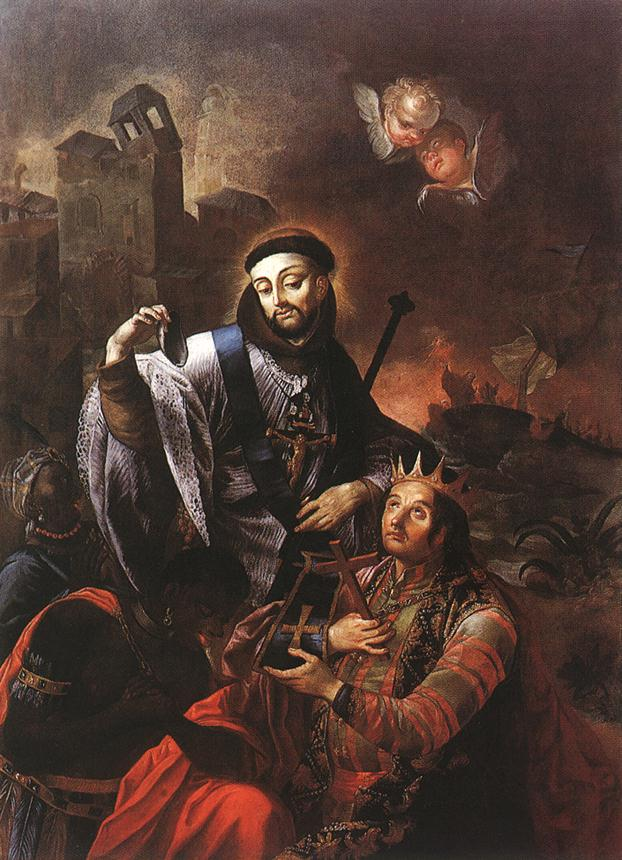
Saint Francis of Solano Baptizing the Indians (1770); in the Bishopric Seminary, Eger

Johann Lucas Kracker, also Jan Lukáš Kracker or János Lukács Kracker (3 March 1717, Vienna - 1 December 1779, Eger) was an Austrian-Czech painter of the late Baroque period. His work consisted mostly of ceiling or wall frescoes and altarpieces.

== Life ==
His family originally came from Bohemia and his father, Josef Kracker (1683–1733), was a sculptor. He received his first training with Anton Hertzog (1692–1740) and continued at the Academy of Fine Arts Vienna after 1738, where his teachers included Paul Troger and Michelangelo Unterberger. His first frescoes, created for the Schlosskirche St. Martin (Graz) in 1742, have not survived.

Initially, he was employed at a workshop in Brno, later becoming independent and working throughout Moravia, briefly settling in Znojmo, where he got married. He then moved on to Upper Hungary in 1754, where he worked in Šaštín and Prešov (both now in Slovakia). From 1760 to 1761, he was in Prague where, despite objections from the Prague Painters' Guild, he executed frescoes at the Church of St. Nikolaus in Malá Strana. From 1762 to 1764, he painted at the Monastery and the Premonstratensian Church in Jasov.

In 1767, he settled in Eger. Bishop Karl von Esterhazy commissioned him to do work for the Diocese of Eger and at the Bishop's properties. Three years later, he created the altarpiece for the "Minoritenkirche" (Franciscan Church) and in 1777 he produced his masterpiece depicting the Council of Trent at the Líceum. He remained in the Bishop's service for the rest of his life, although he occasionally travelled to execute small commissions elsewhere.
