= Giuseppe Alberti =

Italian painter (1664–1716)

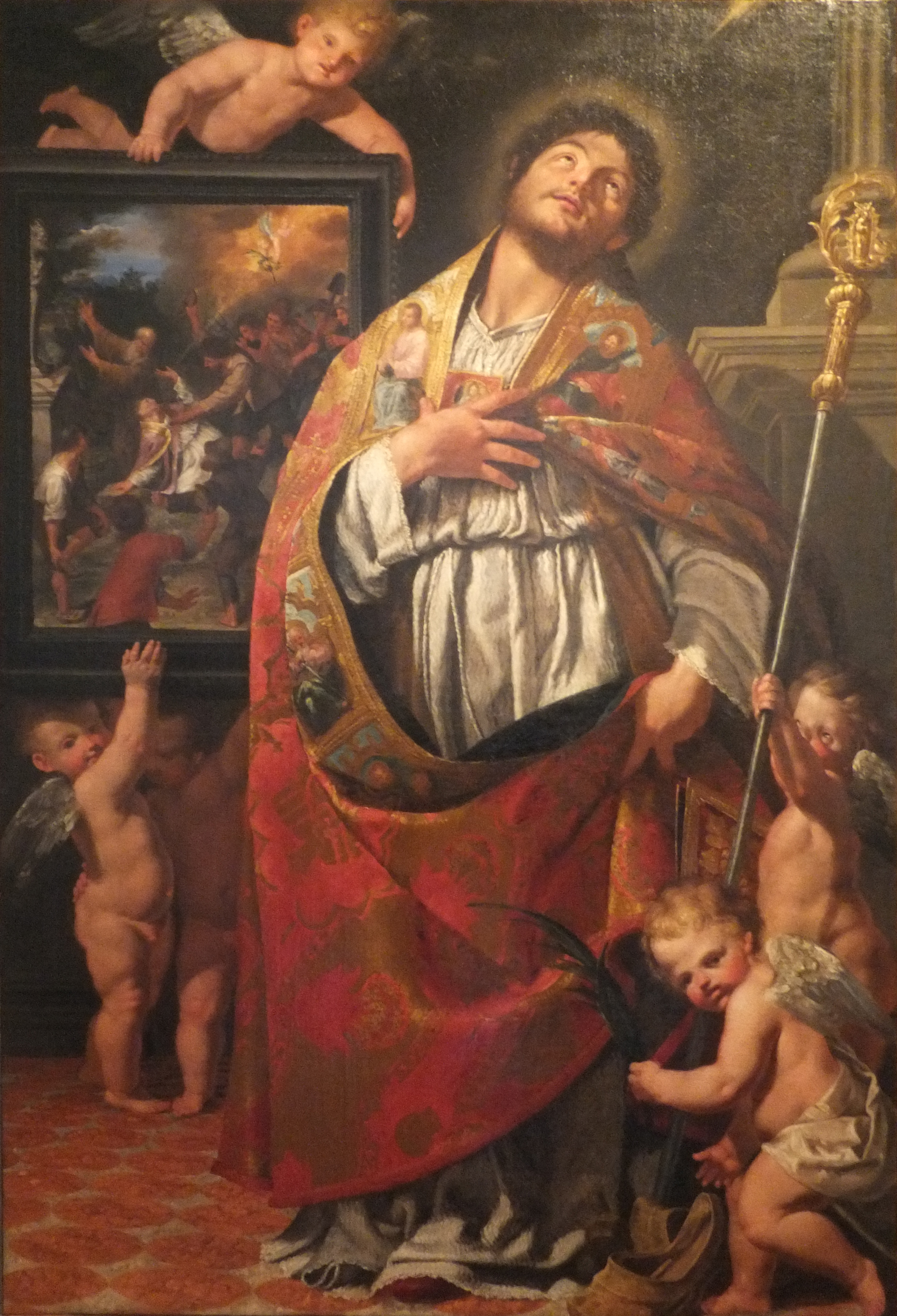
Vigilius of Trent by Giuseppe Alberti, Museo Diocesano Tridentino, 1673

Giuseppe Alberti (3 October 1664 – 3 February 1716) was an Italian painter of the Baroque period. He was born at Cavalese, in what was then Austrian Tyrol. After having studied medicine at Padua he decided to become a painter and architect. He worked under Pietro Liberi in Venice, then in Rome, and finally settled at Trieste. Alberti died at Cavalese.

== Biography ==
Born in Tesero, according to other sources in Cavalese, on 3 October 1640, he was destined to an ecclesiastical career as was typical of large families of that time. He soon demonstrated artistic skills that he cultivated as an autodidact in the local area, signing, in 1661, an altarpiece destined for a chapel near Montagnaga di Pinè.

From 1664 to 1667 he took courses in medicine and law at the University of Padua, that he soon dropped in order to devote himself entirely to art. Trained on the works of late sixteenth-century Venetian painters, Alberti had the opportunity to enrich his artistic education by assimilating the colored heritage of Titian. It helped him to find his own stylistic maturity. He started gradually deviating from the extreme Venetian traditions towards the manner of Marco Liberi. He was in contact with him during his stay in Venice (1668–73), which followed the one dedicated to his studies at the University of Padua (1664–67), but for the color he followed rather the naturalists, such as Bassetti and Mola.

Back in Trento, he created a series of works including The San Vigilio altarpiece (signed and dated 1673) and The Blessed Simonino altarpiece (1677), commissioned by Prince Alberti Poia and currently on display at the Buonconsiglio Castel. From that moment onwards, the Prince Bishop became Giuseppe Alberti's main patron, for both artistic and architectural works.

Alberti had an opportunity to visit Rome, where he could study the most important monuments of the time. As Prince Bishop commissioned to design the Chapel of the Crucifix in the Cathedral of Trento, in 1682 the artist abandoned Rome and returned home.

In 1688 he started working on the frescoes The Triumph of the Faith and Minerva who Chased the Vices to Hell in the two rooms on the first floor of the new Giunta Albertiana, built to connect the Palazzo Magno to Castelvecchio. Both allegorical paintings, in which Alberti seeks spectacular effects described as “looking from beneath”, follow the similar cycles frescoed by him in Palazzo Leoni Montanari in Vicenza.

1689, the year of the death of Prince Bishop Alberti, marked the beginning of the artistic crisis of Giuseppe Alberti who, deprived of the support of his patron, retired to Cavalese, in the Val di Fiemme. In the 90s he performed numerous paintings. Though, in these works it became difficult to distinguish part executed by his hand from the contributions of his apprentices. In this last stage of his artistic activity, Alberti is undoubtedly credited for having laid the foundations for the birth of the so-called "scuola fiemmesa" (the Fiemme Valley school of art).

Giuseppe Alberti died in Cavalese on 3 February 1716.
