= Mother of Sorrows Catholic Church =

- Mother of Sorrows Church
- U.S. National Register of Historic Places
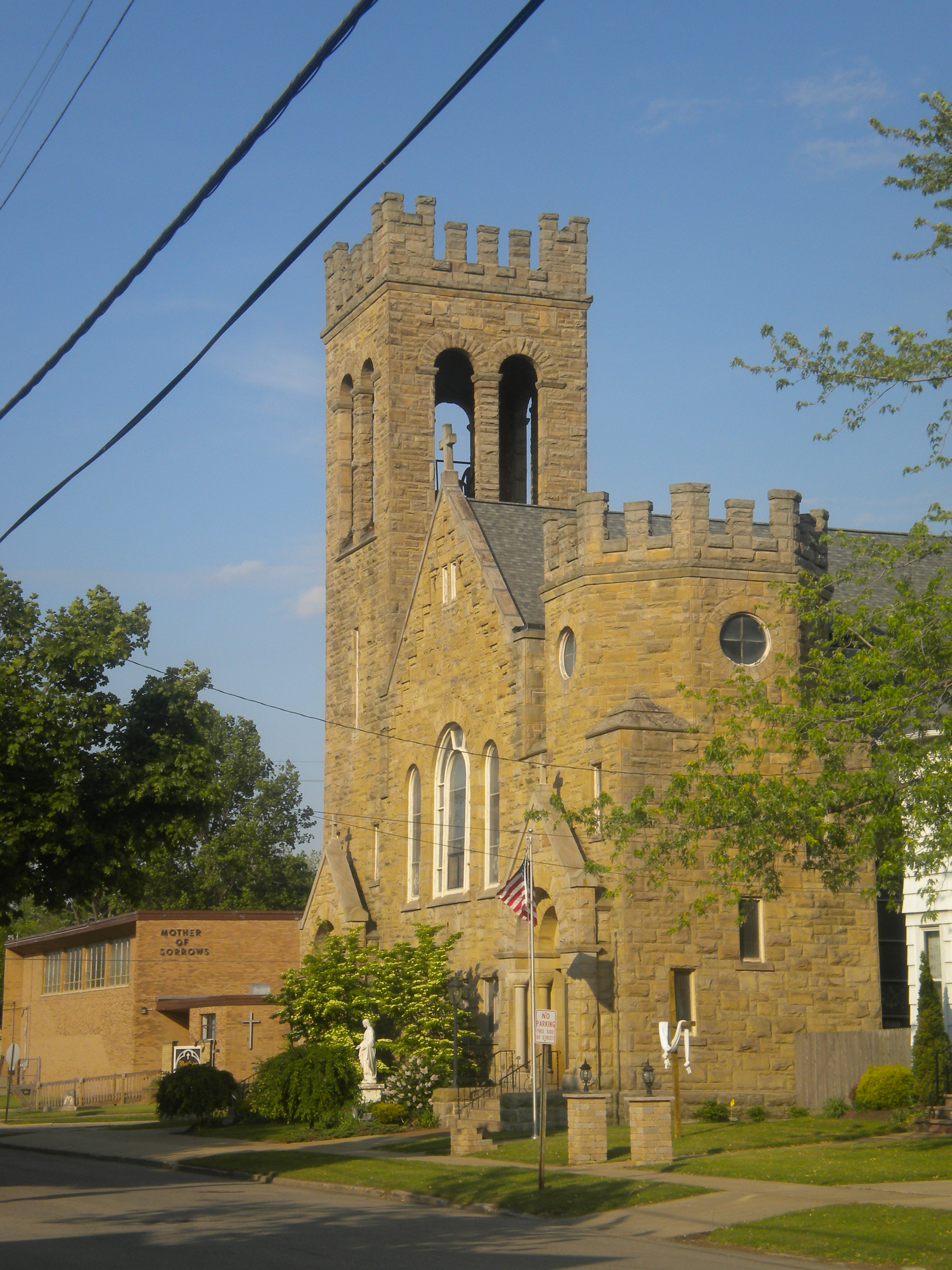
- Front of the church, seen from the southwest

- Location within Ohio Location within the United States
- Location: 1500 W. 6th St., Ashtabula, Ohio
- Coordinates: 41°53′45″N 80°48′13″W
- Area: Less than 1 acre (0.40 ha)
- Built: 1898
- Architect: William P. Ginther
- Architectural style: Romanesque Revival
- NRHP reference No.: 95000170
- Added to NRHP: March 9, 1995

Mother of Sorrows Catholic Church is a historic Catholic church at 1500 W. 6th Street in Ashtabula, Ohio, United States. It was built in the 1890s for a newly established parish and has gained both local and federal designation as a historic site.

The Mass was first celebrated in Ashtabula Harbor in 1878, during the summer only in the early years; the first place of worship was a grocery store. Out of this gathering, a parish was established in 1890 and dedicated to St. Mary under her title of "Mother of Sorrows". Constructed in 1898 in the Romanesque Revival style of architecture, the church was designed by William P. Ginther, an Akron-based architect who specialized in ecclesiastical architecture. Both the foundation and the walls are sandstone, the roof is asphalt, and glass forms a significant part of the exterior. The church occupies a corner lot, and large gables with massive windows face both streets. A square tower with battlements is placed at the corner facing the intersection; the main entrance is set in the tower's base, and a belfry occupies the top third of the tower.

In 1995, Mother of Sorrows was listed on the National Register of Historic Places, qualifying because of its historically significant architecture. In 1978, the city of Ashtabula created the Harbor Historical District, which since a 2010 boundary adjustment has embraced Mother of Sorrows Church and much of the rest of the Ashtabula Harbor neighborhood. Along with the other National Register properties in the district, Mother of Sorrows is protected by city ordinance from significant modifications. Administratively, Mother of Sorrows is overseen by the city's Our Lady of Peace Parish. It no longer uses Mother of Sorrows properties such as its former rectory, school and some parking lots. In 2014, it applied to the city to change zoning on nine plots for potential redevelopment for retail and multi-family residential use. Some residents opposed rezoning, saying it would adversely affect work to stabilize the neighborhood. There was agreement to leave at least some parking to support community use of the church. In early 2017 Pastor of Our Lady of Peace Parish, Rev. Ray Thomas made the announcement that Bishop George Murry of the Diocese of Youngstown ordered the parish to close two of the three churches. Currently no churches have been named but many fear Mother of Sorrows and St. Joseph Churches will close. This would leave Our Lady of Mt. Carmel to serve the community of Ashtabula as the only Catholic Church.

As of 2022, Mother of Sorrows and St. Joseph Church were both closed and only to be used for 2 masses a year under Bishop David Bonner. In 2024 Mother of Sorrows had some of its ceiling fall into the church, leaving many to believe the building has structure damage. Fr. John Keehner, Pastor of Our Lady of Peace Parish is waiting on an independent study by the diocese whether to premaritally close the church. At this point in time, it looks to be the direction and fate of the historic church.

On April 6, 2025 Bishop Elect John Keehner, Bishop Elect of Souix City Iowa, announced in a letter from Bishop Bonner, at the 4:30 mass that Mother of Sorrows has significant structural issues in the ceiling and truss work. After 2 independent studies, the church would need 1.2-2 million dollars work of upgrades in order to reopen the structure. Bishop Bonner feels that the church can’t afford to take on the project and that it will remain closed. St. Joseph Church in Ashtabula also remains a secondary worship site for the parish but will likely see the same fate as Mother of Sorrows. June 18, 2026 will be the Closing Mass for St. Joseph Church in Ashtabula. Fr. Connor Hetzel now Pastor, Nick Perkowski, Pastoral Leader, and the parish finance and parish councils will work with the diocese to see what is next.

On October 5, 2025 the Diocese of Youngstown and Bishop David Bonner released a statement for Mother of Sorrows and St. Joseph Church both secondary worship sites for Our Lady of Peace Parish. "Upon a petition presented by the pastoral and finance councils of Our Lady of Peace Parish, the Presbyteral Council unanimously recommended that Our Lady of Peace Parish churches of Mother of Sorrows and Saint Joseph be reduced to profane but not sordid use, effective November 30, 2025. Mother of Sorrows Church had ceiling damage that could be remediated, however that repair was only addressing a narrowly defined section of the ceiling and does not come with a guarantee that such work would be sufficient. Saint Joseph Church has several needs to be addressed, however, due to the decline of the neighborhood, it was necessary to institute a sign-up procedure to safeguard parishioners and parish property for weekly prayer. Since the Octave of Easter, no one has been participating in the preservation of the spiritual and historical heritage of the church."
