= List of twin towns and sister cities in Japan =

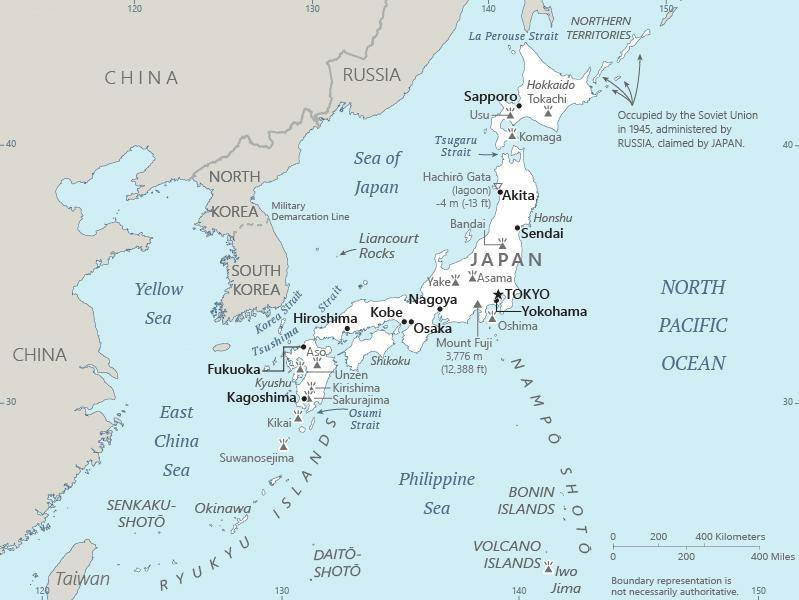
Map of Japan

This is a list of municipalities in Japan which have standing links to local communities in other countries. In most cases, the association, especially when formalised by local government, is known as "town twinning" (usually in Europe) or "sister cities" (usually in the rest of the world).

For twinning between Japanese and Chinese municipalities the term "friendship cities" is used, due to problematic translation (the term "sister cities" requires specification of which of the cities is the younger sister and which is the older one).

== A ==
Ageo

- Lockyer Valley, Australia

Akabira

- Kaga, Japan
- Samcheok, South Korea
- Yueyang, China

Akashi

- Vallejo, United States
- Wuxi, China

Akita

- Hitachiōta, Japan
- Kenai, United States
- Lanzhou, China
- Passau, Germany
- St. Cloud, United States
- Vladivostok, Russia

Akkeshi

- Clarence, Australia

Amagasaki

- Anshan, China
- Augsburg, Germany

Anjō

- Hobsons Bay, Australia
- Huntington Beach, United States
- Kolding, Denmark

Aomori

- Kecskemét, Hungary
- Pyeongtaek, South Korea

Aridagawa

- Guixi, China
- Palmerston, Australia

Arita

- Jingdezhen, China
- Meissen, Germany

Asago

- Newberg, United States
- Perth, Canada

Asahikawa

- Bloomington, United States
- Harbin, China
- Minamisatsuma, Japan
- Normal, United States
- Suwon, South Korea

Asakuchi

- Gao'an, China
- Tea Tree Gully, Australia

Ashikaga

- Kamakura, Japan
- Jining, China
- Springfield, United States

Ashiya

- Montebello, United States

Atami

- Beppu, Japan
- Cascais, Portugal
- Sanremo, Italy
- Zhuhai, China

Atsugi

- Gunpo, South Korea
- New Britain, United States
- Yangzhou, China

Ayabe

- Changshu, China
- Jerusalem, Israel

== B ==
Beppu

- Bath, England, United Kingdom
- Mokpo, South Korea
- Rotorua Lakes, New Zealand
- Yantai, China

== C ==
Chiba

- Asunción, Paraguay
- Houston, United States
- North Vancouver, Canada
- Quezon City, Philippines
- Tianjin, China
- Wujiang (Suzhou), China

Chichibu

- Antioch, United States
- Gangneung, South Korea
- Linfen, China
- San'yō-Onoda, Japan
- Toshima (Tokyo), Japan
- Warringah (Northern Beaches), Australia

Chigasaki

- Honolulu, United States

Chitose

- Anchorage, United States
- Ibusuki, Japan
- Kongsberg, Norway

== D ==
Daisen

- Temecula, United States
- Yangyang, South Korea

Dazaifu

- Buyeo, South Korea

== E ==
Ebetsu

- Gresham, United States

Esashi

- Sollefteå, Sweden

== F ==
Fuji

- Jiaxing, China
- Oceanside, United States

Fujieda

- Penrith, Australia
- Yangju, South Korea

Fujikawaguchiko

- Zermatt, Switzerland

Fujimi

- Šabac, Serbia

Fujinomiya

- Ōmihachiman, Japan
- Santa Monica, United States
- Shaoxing, China
- Yeongju, South Korea

Fujisawa

- Boryeong, South Korea
- Kunming, China
- Matsumoto, Japan
- Miami Beach, United States
- Windsor, Canada

Fujiyoshida

- Chamonix-Mont-Blanc, France
- Colorado Springs, United States

Fukaya

- Fremont, United States
- Shunyi (Beijing), China

Fukagawa

- Abbotsford, Canada

Fukui

- Fullerton, United States
- Hangzhou, China
- Kumamoto, Japan
- New Brunswick, United States

Fukuoka

- Atlanta, United States
- Auckland, New Zealand
- Bordeaux, France
- Busan, South Korea
- Guangzhou, China
- Ipoh, Malaysia
- Oakland, United States
- Yangon, Myanmar

Fukuroi

- Hillsboro, United States
- Shiojiri, Japan

Fukuyama

- Hamilton, Canada
- Maui County, United States
- Okazaki, Japan
- Pohang, South Korea
- Tacloban, Philippines

Funabashi

- Hayward, United States
- Odense, Denmark
- Xi'an, China

Furano

- Nishiwaki, Japan
- Schladming, Austria

== G ==
Gifu

- Campinas, Brazil
- Cincinnati, United States
- Hangzhou, China
- Meidling (Vienna), Austria
- Thunder Bay, Canada

Gotemba

- Beaverton, United States
- Chambersburg, United States

== H ==
=== Ha ===
Habikino

- Hietzing (Vienna), Austria

Hachinohe

- Federal Way, United States

Hachiōji

- Kaohsiung, Taiwan
- Nikkō, Japan
- Odawara, Japan
- Siheung, South Korea
- Tai'an, China
- Tomakomai, Japan
- Wriezen, Germany
- Yorii, Japan

Hadano

- Paju, South Korea
- Pasadena, United States

Hagi

- Deokjin (Yeongam), South Korea
- Kamakura, Japan
- Shimoda, Japan
- Ühlingen-Birkendorf, Germany
- Ulsan, South Korea
- Wajima, Japan

Hakodate

- Goyang, South Korea
- Halifax, Canada
- Lake Macquarie, Australia
- Vladivostok, Russia
- Yuzhno-Sakhalinsk, Russia

Hakone

- Jasper, Canada
- Taupō, New Zealand

Hamamatsu

- Ahmedabad, India
- Camas, United States
- Chehalis, United States
- Hangzhou, China
- Porterville, United States
- Rochester, United States

Hanamaki

- Berndorf, Austria
- Hot Springs, United States
- Rutland, United States

Handa

- Midland, United States
- Port Macquarie-Hastings, Australia
- Xuzhou, China

Hannō

- Brea, United States

Hanyū

- Baguio, Philippines
- Durbuy, Belgium

Hatsukaichi

- Hawaii County, United States
- Masterton, New Zealand

Hayama

- Holdfast Bay, Australia
- Kusatsu, Gunma, Japan

=== He–Ho ===
Hekinan

- Edmonds, United States
- Pula, Croatia
- Yuni, Japan

Hidaka

- Osan, South Korea

Higashihiroshima

- Deyang, China
- Kitahiroshima, Japan
- Marília, Brazil

Higashikawa

- Canmore, Canada
- Rūjiena, Latvia

Higashimurayama

- Independence, United States
- Kashiwazaki, Japan

Higashiōmi

- Jangam-myeon (Buyeo), South Korea
- Marquette, United States
- Rättvik, Sweden
- Taber, Canada

Higashiōsaka

- Glendale, United States
- Mitte (Berlin), Germany

Hikone

- Ann Arbor, United States
- Xiangtan, China

Himeji

- Adelaide, Australia
- Changwon, South Korea
- Charleroi, Belgium
- Curitiba, Brazil
- Matsumoto, Japan
- Phoenix, United States
- Taiyuan, China
- Tottori, Japan

Hino

- Redlands, United States
- Shiwa, Japan

Hirakata

- Changning (Shanghai), China
- Logan, Australia
- Yeongam, South Korea

Hiratsuka

- Lawrence, United States

Hiroshima

- Chongqing, China
- Daegu, South Korea
- Hanover, Germany
- Honolulu, United States
- Montreal, Canada
- Volgograd, Russia

Hitachi

- Birmingham, United States
- Kiryū, Japan
- Tauranga, New Zealand

Hōfu

- Akitakata, Japan
- Chuncheon, South Korea
- Monroe, United States

== I ==
=== Ib–In ===
Ibaraki

- Anqing, China
- Minneapolis, United States
- Shōdoshima, Japan

Ichihara

- Mobile, United States

Ichinoseki

- Central Highlands, Australia

Ichikawa

- Gardena, United States
- Issy-les-Moulineaux, France
- Leshan, China
- Medan, Indonesia
- Rosenheim, Germany

Iizuka

- Sunnyvale, United States

Ikata

- Red Wing, United States

Ikeda

- Launceston, Australia
- Suzhou, China

Imabari

- Lakeland, United States
- Onomichi, Japan
- Ōta, Japan
- Panama City, Panama

Inashiki

- Salmon Arm, Canada

Inazawa

- Olympia, Greece

Inuyama

- Davis, United States
- Haman, South Korea
- Nichinan, Japan
- Sankt Goarshausen, Germany
- Tateyama, Japan
- Xiangyang, China

=== Ir–It ===
Iruma

- Fenghua (Ningbo), China
- Sado, Japan
- Wolfratshausen, Germany

Isahaya

- Athens, United States
- Zhangzhou, China

Isehara

- La Mirada, United States

Isesaki

- Ma'anshan, China
- Springfield, United States

Ishikari

- Campbell River, Canada
- Pengzhou, China
- Vanino, Russia

Ishinomaki

- Hitachinaka, Japan
- Wenzhou, China

Itami

- Foshan, China
- Hasselt, Belgium
- Ōmura, Japan

Itō

- Ismayilli, Azerbaijan
- Medway, England, United Kingdom
- Rieti, Italy
- Suwa, Japan

Itoshima

- Escondido, United States
- Qingpu (Shanghai), China

=== Iw–Iz ===
Iwaki

- Kauai County, United States
- Nobeoka, Japan
- Townsville, Australia
- Yurihonjō, Japan

Iwakuni

- Everett, United States
- Jundiaí, Brazil
- Tottori, Japan

Iwanuma

- Nankoku, Japan
- Napa, United States

Iwata

- Dagupan, Philippines
- Mountain View, United States

Izu

- Hope, Canada
- Nelson, Canada

Izumi, Kagoshima

- Puli, Taiwan
- Suncheon, South Korea

Izumi, Osaka

- Bloomington, United States

Izumo

- Kalajoki, Finland
- Santa Clara, United States

== J ==
Jōetsu

- Ena, Japan
- Hokuto, Japan
- Hunchun, China
- Itakura, Japan
- Iwanai, Japan
- Lilienfeld, Austria
- Muroran, Japan
- Pohang, South Korea
- Shizuoka, Japan
- Ueda, Japan
- Yonezawa, Japan

Jōyō

- Gyeongsan, South Korea
- Vancouver, United States

== K ==
=== Ka ===
Kadoma

- Eindhoven, Netherlands
- Kami, Japan
- São José dos Campos, Brazil

Kagoshima

- Changsha, China
- Miami, United States
- Naples, Italy
- Perth, Australia
- Tsuruoka, Japan

Kahoku

- Meßkirch, Germany

Kakamigahara

- Chuncheon, South Korea

Kakegawa

- Corning, United States
- Eugene, United States
- Hoengseong, South Korea
- Ōshū, Japan
- Pesaro, Italy

Kakogawa

- Auckland, New Zealand
- Guilin, China
- Maringá, Brazil

Kamagaya

- Whakatāne, New Zealand

Kamakura

- Ashikaga, Japan
- Dunhuang, China
- Hagi, Japan
- Nice, France
- Ueda, Japan

Kameoka

- Jandira, Brazil
- Knittelfeld, Germany
- Stillwater, United States

Kamo

- Komsomolsk-on-Amur, Russia
- Zibo, China

Kamogawa

- Manitowoc, United States
- Minobu, Japan

Kanazawa

- Buffalo, United States
- Ghent, Belgium
- Irkutsk, Russia
- Jeonju, South Korea
- Nancy, France
- Porto Alegre, Brazil
- Suzhou, China

Kannami

- Kerman, United States

Karatsu

- Yangzhou, China
- Yeosu, South Korea

Kariya

- Mississauga, Canada

Kashiwa

- Ayase, Japan
- Camden, Australia
- Chengde, China
- Guam, United States
- Torrance, United States

Kashiwara

- Grosseto, Italy
- Xinxiang, China

Kasugai

- Kelowna, Canada

Kasukabe

- Fraser Coast, Australia
- Pasadena, United States

Katano

- Collingwood, Canada

Katō

- Chelan, United States
- Hollister, United States
- Olympia, United States

Kawachinagano

- Carmel, United States

Kawagoe

- Autun, France
- Nakasatsunai, Japan
- Obama, Japan
- Offenbach am Main, Germany
- Salem, United States
- Tanagura, Japan

Kawasaki

- Baltimore, United States
- Rijeka, Croatia
- Shenyang, China
- Wollongong, Australia

=== Ki ===
KKinokawa

- Binzhou, China
- Seogwipo, South Korea

Kirishima

- Liuyang, China
- Sonora, United States
- Yaozhou (Tongchuan), China

Kiryū

- Biella, Italy
- Columbus, United States
- Hitachi, Japan
- Naruto, Japan

Kisarazu

- Oceanside, United States

Kishiwada

- Shantou, China
- South San Francisco, United States
- Yeongdeungpo (Seoul), South Korea

Kitakami

- Concord, United States
- Sanmenxia, China
- Shibata, Japan

Kitakyushu

- Dalian, China
- Haiphong, Vietnam
- Incheon, South Korea
- Norfolk, United States
- Phnom Penh, Cambodia
- Tacoma, United States

Kitami

- Barrhead, Canada
- Elizabeth, United States
- Jinju, South Korea
- Kōchi, Japan
- Marumori, Japan
- Sakawa, Japan

Kiyosu

- Jerez de la Frontera, Spain

Kizugawa

- Santa Monica, United States

=== Ko ===
Kobe

- Barcelona, Spain
- Brisbane, Australia
- Incheon, South Korea
- Marseille, France
- Riga, Latvia
- Rio de Janeiro, Brazil
- Seattle, United States
- Tianjin, China

Kōchi

- Fresno, United States
- Kitami, Japan
- Surabaya, Indonesia
- Wuhu, China

Kōfu

- Chengdu, China
- Des Moines, United States
- Lodi, United States
- Pau, France
- Yamatokōriyama, Japan

Kōka

- DeWitt, United States
- Icheon, South Korea
- Marshall, United States
- Traverse City, United States

Kokubunji

- Sado, Japan
- Marion, Australia

Komaki

- Anyang, South Korea
- Wyandotte, United States

Komatsu

- Gateshead, England, United Kingdom
- Jining, China
- Suzano, Brazil
- Vilvoorde, Belgium

Kosai

- Greater Geraldton, Australia

Koshigaya

- Campbelltown, Australia

=== Ku–Ky ===
Kuji

- Franklin, United States
- Klaipėda, Lithuania

Kuki

- Roseburg, United States

Kumagaya

- Invercargill, New Zealand

Kumamoto

- Fukui, Japan
- Guilin, China
- Heidelberg, Germany
- Rome, United States
- San Antonio, United States

Kurashiki

- Christchurch, New Zealand
- Kansas City, United States
- Sankt Pölten, Austria
- Zhenjiang, China

Kure

- Bremerton, United States
- Changwon, South Korea
- Keelung, Taiwan
- Marbella, Spain
- Wenzhou, China

Kurume

- Hefei, China
- Modesto, United States

Kusatsu, Gunma

- Bietigheim-Bissingen, Germany
- Hayama, Japan
- Karlovy Vary, Czech Republic
- Neustift im Stubaital, Austria
- Snowy Monaro, Australia

Kusatsu, Shiga

- Kan'onji, Japan
- Pontiac, United States
- Xuhui (Shanghai), China

Kushimoto

- Hemet, United States
- Mersin, Turkey
- Torres, Australia
- Yakakent, Turkey

Kushiro

- Burnaby, Canada
- Kholmsk, Russia
- Petropavlovsk-Kamchatsky, Russia
- Tottori, Japan
- Yuzawa, Japan

Kyōtamba

- Hawkesbury, Australia

Kyōtango

- Bozhou, China

Kyoto

- Boston, United States
- Cologne, Germany
- Florence, Italy
- Guadalajara, Mexico
- Kyiv, Ukraine
- Prague, Czech Republic
- Xi'an, China
- Zagreb, Croatia

== M ==
=== Ma ===
Maebashi

- Birmingham, United States

Maizuru

- Dalian, China
- Nakhodka, Russia
- Portsmouth, England, United Kingdom

Marugame

- Kyōgoku, Japan
- San Sebastián, Spain
- Willich, Germany
- Zhangjiagang, China

Matsudo

- Whitehorse, Australia

Matsue

- Jilin City, China
- New Orleans, United States
- Ōguchi, Japan
- Onomichi, Japan
- Suzu, Japan
- Takarazuka, Japan
- Yinchuan, China

Matsumoto

- Fujisawa, Japan
- Grindelwald, Switzerland
- Himeji, Japan
- Kathmandu, Nepal
- Langfang, China
- Salt Lake City, United States
- Takayama, Japan

Matsusaka

- Binhu (Wuxi), China

Matsuura

- Mackay, Australia

Matsuyama

- Freiburg im Breisgau, Germany
- Sacramento, United States

=== Mi ===
Miharu

- Rice Lake, United States

Miki

- Federation, Australia
- Visalia, United States

Minamata

- Devonport, Australia

Minamiashigara

- Tilburg, Netherlands

Minamiuonuma

- Ashburton, New Zealand
- Lillehammer, Norway
- Sölden, Austria

Minami-Alps

- Anamizu, Japan
- Dujiangyan, China
- Marshalltown, United States
- Ogasawara, Japan
- Tsubetsu, Japan
- Winterset, United States

Minoh

- Cuernavaca, Mexico
- Hutt, New Zealand

Minokamo

- Dubbo, Australia

Mishima

- New Plymouth, New Zealand
- Pasadena, United States

Mito

- Anaheim, United States

Miura

- Suzaka, Japan
- Warrnambool, Australia

Miyazaki

- Boeun, South Korea
- Kashihara, Japan
- Huludao, China
- Virginia Beach, United States
- Waukegan, United States

Miyazu

- Delray Beach, United States
- Nelson, New Zealand
- Qinhuangdao, China

Miyoshi, Saitama

- Petaling Jaya, Malaysia

Miyoshi, Tokushima

- The Dalles, United States
- Tukwila, United States

=== Mo–My ===
Mobara

- Salisbury, Australia

Monbetsu

- Fairbanks, United States
- Korsakov, Russia
- Newport, United States

Moriguchi

- New Westminster, Canada

Morioka

- Victoria, Canada

Mukō

- Saratoga, United States

Munakata

- Gimhae, South Korea

Murayama

- Yakutsk, Russia

Muroran

- Jōetsu, Japan
- Knoxville, United States
- Miyakojima, Japan
- Rizhao, China
- Shizuoka, Japan

Myōkō

- Schruns, Austria
- Slovenj Gradec, Slovenia
- Tschagguns, Austria
- Zermatt, Switzerland

== N ==
=== Na ===
Nagahama

- Augsburg, Germany
- Verona, Italy

Nagaizumi

- Aoki, Japan
- Whanganui, New Zealand

Nagakute

- Waterloo, Belgium

Nagano

- Clearwater, United States
- Shijiazhuang, China

Nagaoka

- Fort Worth, United States
- Honolulu, United States
- Romainmôtier-Envy, Switzerland
- Taiʻarapu-Ouest, French Polynesia
- Trier, Germany

Nagaokakyō

- Arlington, United States
- Ningbo, China

Nagasaki

- Fuzhou, China
- Leiden, Netherlands
- Porto, Portugal
- Saint Paul, United States
- Santos, Brazil
- Vaux-sur-Aure, France

Nagato

- Sochi, Russia

Nagoya

- Los Angeles, United States
- Mexico City, Mexico
- Reims, France
- Sydney, Australia
- Turin, Italy

Naha

- Fuzhou, China
- Honolulu, United States
- Nichinan, Japan
- São Vicente, Brazil

Nanao

- Bratsk, Russia
- Gimcheon, South Korea
- Jinzhou (Dalian), China
- Monterey, United States
- Morgantown, United States

Nantan

- Clutha, New Zealand
- Manila, Philippines

Nara

- Canberra, Australia
- Gyeongju, South Korea
- Kōriyama, Japan
- Obama, Japan
- Toledo, Spain
- Versailles, France
- Xi'an, China
- Yangzhou, China

Narashino

- Tuscaloosa, United States

Narita

- Foxton (Horowhenua), New Zealand
- San Bruno, United States
- Taoyuan, Taiwan
- Xianyang, China

Naruto

- Kiryū, Japan
- Lüneburg, Germany

Nasushiobara

- Hitachinaka, Japan
- Linz, Austria
- Namerikawa, Japan
- Niiza, Japan

Natori

- Guararapes, Brazil
- Kaminoyama, Japan
- Shingū, Japan

=== Ne–Nu ===
Neyagawa

- Huangpu (Shanghai), China
- Newport News, United States
- Oakville, Canada

Nichinan

- Albany, Australia
- Inuyama, Japan
- Naha, Japan
- Portsmouth, United States

Niigata

- Birobidzhan, Russia
- Galveston, United States
- Harbin, China
- Khabarovsk, Russia
- Kingston upon Hull, England, United Kingdom
- Nantes, France
- Vladivostok, Russia

Niihama

- Dezhou, China

Niiza

- Jiyuan, China
- Jyväskylä, Finland
- Nasushiobara, Japan
- Tōkamachi, Japan

Nikkō

- Hachiōji, Japan
- Odawara, Japan
- Rapid City, United States
- Tomakomai, Japan

Nishinomiya

- Shaoxing, China
- Spokane, United States

Nishinoomote

- Isa, Japan
- Vila do Bispo, Portugal

Nishio

- Porirua, New Zealand

Nobeoka

- Iwaki, Japan
- Jinzhou (Dalian), China
- Medford, United States
- Sakai, Japan

Nosegawa

- Vysoké Tatry, Slovakia

Numata

- Port Hardy, Canada

Numazu

- Kalamazoo, United States
- Yueyang, China

== O ==
=== Ob–Oi ===
Obama

- Gyeongju, South Korea
- Kawagoe, Japan
- Nara, Japan

Obihiro

- Chaoyang, China
- Madison, United States
- Seward, United States

Ōbu

- Port Phillip, Australia

Ōda

- Daejeon, South Korea

Odawara

- Chula Vista, United States
- Hachiōji, Japan
- Nikkō, Japan
- Yorii, Japan

Ōgaki

- Glen Eira, Australia
- Hioki, Japan

Ōiso

- Dayton, United States
- Racine, United States

Ōita

- Austin, United States
- Aveiro, Portugal
- Wuhan, China

=== Ok–Om ===
Okaya

- Mount Pleasant, United States

Okayama

- Guam, United States
- Hsinchu, Taiwan
- Luoyang, China
- Plovdiv, Bulgaria
- San José, Costa Rica
- San Jose, United States

Okazaki

- Newport Beach, United States
- Uddevalla, Sweden

Okinawa

- Lakewood, United States
- Tōkai, Japan
- Toyonaka, Japan
- Yonezawa, Japan

Okinoshima

- Krotoszyn, Poland

Okoppe

- Stettler, Canada

Omaezaki

- Uljin, South Korea

Ōmihachiman

- Fujinomiya, Japan
- Grand Rapids, United States
- Kaminokuni, Japan
- Leavenworth, United States
- Mantua, Italy
- Matsumae, Japan
- Miryang, South Korea

Ōmura

- Itami, Japan
- San Carlos, United States
- Semboku, Japan
- Sintra, Portugal

Ōmuta

- Datong, China
- Muskegon, United States

=== On–Oy ===
Ono

- Lindsay, United States

Osaka

- Chicago, United States
- Greater Manchester, England, United Kingdom
- Hamburg, Germany
- Melbourne, Australia
- Milan, Italy
- Saint Petersburg, Russia
- São Paulo, Brazil
- Shanghai, China

Ōsaki

- Dublin, United States
- Jinshui (Zhengzhou), China
- Kurobe, Japan
- Middletown, United States
- Taitō (Tokyo), Japan
- Tōbetsu, Japan
- Uwajima, Japan

Ōshima

- Hawaii County, United States

Ōshū

- Atsuma, Japan
- Breitenwang, Austria
- Greater Shepparton, Australia
- Kakegawa, Japan
- Naganuma, Japan
- Reutte, Austria

Ōta

- Burbank, United States
- Imabari, Japan
- Lafayette, United States
- Tippecanoe County, United States
- West Lafayette, United States

Otaru

- Dunedin, New Zealand
- Gangseo (Seoul), South Korea
- Nakhodka, Russia

Ōtsu

- Gumi, South Korea
- Interlaken, Switzerland
- Lansing, United States
- Mudanjiang, China
- Würzburg, Germany

Oyama

- Mission, Canada

== R ==
Rankoshi

- Saalfelden am Steinernen Meer, Austria

Rikuzentakata

- Crescent City, United States

Rumoi

- Ulan-Ude, Russia

== S ==
=== Sa ===
Saga

- Cussac-Fort-Médoc, France
- Glens Falls, United States
- Lianyungang, China
- Warren County, United States
- Yeonje (Busan), South Korea

Sagae

- Andong, South Korea
- Giresun, Turkey
- Samukawa, Japan

Sagamihara

- Wuxi, China

Saijō

- Baoding, China
- Seeboden am Millstätter See, Austria

Saiki

- Gladstone, Australia
- Handan, China

Saitama

- Hamilton, New Zealand
- Pittsburgh, United States
- Richmond, United States
- Toluca, Mexico
- Zhengzhou, China

Sakado

- Dothan, United States

Sakai

- Berkeley, United States
- Lianyungang, China
- Wellington, New Zealand

Sakata

- Delaware, United States
- Tangshan, China
- Zheleznogorsk-Ilimsky, Russia

Saku

- Avallon, France
- Saku, Estonia

Sakurai

- Chartres, France

Sanda

- Blue Mountains, Australia
- Jeju City, South Korea
- Kittitas County, United States

Sano

- Lancaster, United States
- Quzhou, China

Sanuki

- Eisenstadt, Austria

Sapporo

- Daejeon, South Korea
- Munich, Germany
- Novosibirsk, Russia
- Portland, United States
- Shenyang, China

Sasebo

- Albuquerque, United States
- Coffs Harbour, Australia
- Kokonoe, Japan
- Paju, South Korea
- Xiamen, China

Satsumasendai

- Changshu, China

Sayama

- Tongyeong, South Korea
- Worthington, United States

=== Se ===
Seika

- Norman, United States

Seki

- Himi, Japan
- Huangshi, China
- Mogi das Cruzes, Brazil

Sendai

- Acapulco, Mexico
- Changchun, China
- Dallas, United States
- Gwangju, South Korea
- Minsk, Belarus
- Nakano, Japan
- Rennes, France
- Riverside, United States
- Shiraoi, Japan
- Taketa, Japan
- Uwajima, Japan

Seto

- Icheon, South Korea
- Jingdezhen, China
- Limoges, France
- Nabeul, Tunisia

Setouchi

- Horokanai, Japan
- Mytilene, Greece
- Tsushima, Japan

Settsu

- Bengbu, China
- Bundaberg, Australia

=== Sh ===
Shibata

- Orange City, United States
- St. James, United States
- Suzaka, Japan

Shibukawa

- Abano Terme, Italy
- Foligno, Italy
- Hawaii County, United States

Shijōnawate

- Meerbusch, Germany

Shikokuchūō

- Xuancheng, China

Shimada

- Brienz, Switzerland
- Himi, Japan
- Huzhou, China
- Richmond, United States

Shimizu

- Squamish, Canada

Shimoda

- Hagi, Japan
- Newport, United States
- Numata, Japan

Shimonoseki

- Busan, South Korea
- Istanbul, Turkey
- Pittsburg, United States
- Qingdao, China
- Santos, Brazil

Shirakawa

- Compiègne, France

Shizuoka

- Cannes, France
- Jōetsu, Japan
- Muroran, Japan
- Omaha, United States
- Shelbyville, United States
- Stockton, United States

Shūnan

- Delfzijl, Netherlands
- São Bernardo do Campo, Brazil
- Townsville, Australia

=== So–Su ===
Sodegaura

- Itajaí, Brazil

Sōka

- Anyang, China
- Carson, United States
- Shōwa, Japan

Sugito

- Busselton, Australia

Suita

- Canterbury-Bankstown, Australia
- Moratuwa, Sri Lanka

Sumoto

- Hawaii County, United States
- Kronstadt, Russia
- Van Wert, United States

Susono

- Frankston, Australia

Suzaka

- Miura, Japan
- Shibata, Japan
- Siping, China

Suzuka

- Bellefontaine, United States
- Le Mans, France

== T ==
=== Ta–Te ===
Takamatsu

- Nanchang, China
- St. Petersburg, United States
- Tours, France

Takarazuka

- Alsergrund (Vienna), Austria
- Augusta, United States
- Matsue, Japan

Takasaki

- Battle Creek, United States
- Muntinlupa, Philippines
- Plzeň, Czech Republic
- Santo André, Brazil

Takatsuki

- Changzhou, China
- Masuda, Japan
- Manila, Philippines
- Toowoomba, Australia
- Wakasa, Japan

Takayama

- Denver, United States
- Kunming, China
- Lijiang, China
- Matsumoto, Japan

Tamba-Sasayama

- Walla Walla, United States

Tamano

- Gloucester, United States
- Jiujiang, China
- Tongyeong, South Korea

Tatebayashi

- Kunshan, China
- Sunshine Coast, Australia

Tateyama

- Bellingham, United States
- Port Stephens, Australia

Tendō

- Marlborough, New Zealand
- Marostica, Italy
- Wafangdian, China

Tenri

- Bauru, Brazil
- Seosan, South Korea
- La Serena, Chile

=== To ===
Tōbetsu

- Leksand, Sweden
- Ōsaki, Japan
- Uwajima, Japan

Tochigi

- Evansville, United States
- Jinhua, China

Toda

- Kaifeng, China
- Liverpool, Australia

Tōkai

- Kamaishi, Japan
- Macedon Ranges, Australia
- Nilüfer, Turkey
- Okinawa, Japan
- Yonezawa, Japan

Tōkamachi

- Como, Italy
- Niiza, Japan

Toki

- Faenza, Italy

Tokorozawa

- Anyang, South Korea
- Changzhou, China
- Decatur, United States

Tokushima

- Leiria, Portugal
- Saginaw, United States

Tokyo

- Beijing, China
- Berlin, Germany
- Cairo, Egypt
- Jakarta, Indonesia
- London, England, United Kingdom
- Moscow, Russia
- New South Wales, Australia
- New York City, United States
- São Paulo State, Brazil
- Seoul, South Korea

Tokyo – Adachi

- Belmont, Australia
- Kanuma, Japan
- Uonuma, Japan
- Yamanouchi, Japan

Tokyo – Arakawa

- Donaustadt (Vienna), Austria
- Zhongshan (Dalian), China

Tokyo – Bunkyō

- Beyoğlu, Turkey
- Kaiserslautern, Germany

Tokyo – Chūō

- Sutherland, Australia

Tokyo – Edogawa

- Central Coast, Australia
- Honolulu, United States

Tokyo – Itabashi

- Burlington, Canada

Tokyo – Katsushika

- Fengtai (Beijing), China
- Floridsdorf (Vienna), Austria
- Mapo (Seoul), South Korea

Tokyo – Kōtō

- Surrey, Canada

Tokyo – Meguro

- Dongcheng (Beijing), China
- Jungnang (Seoul), South Korea

Tokyo – Nerima

- Haidian (Beijing), China
- Ipswich, Australia

Tokyo – Ōta

- Chaoyang (Beijing), China
- Salem, United States

Tokyo – Setagaya

- Bunbury, Australia
- Döbling (Vienna), Austria
- Winnipeg, Canada

Tokyo – Shibuya

- Portland, United States
- Üsküdar, Turkey

Tokyo – Shinagawa

- Portland, United States

Tokyo – Shinjuku

- Dongcheng (Beijing), China
- Ina, Japan
- Lefkada, Greece
- Mitte (Berlin), Germany

Tokyo – Suginami

- Seocho (Seoul), South Korea
- Willoughby, Australia

Tokyo – Taitō

- Gladsaxe, Denmark
- Innere Stadt (Vienna), Austria
- Northern Beaches, Australia
- Ōsaki, Japan

Tomakomai

- Hachiōji, Japan
- Napier, New Zealand
- Nikkō, Japan

Tome

- Nyūzen, Japan
- Southlake, United States
- Vernon, Canada

Tonami

- Lisse, Netherlands
- Panjin, China
- Yalova, Turkey

Tosu

- Zeitz, Germany

Tottori

- Cheongju, South Korea
- Hanau, Germany
- Himeji, Japan
- Iwakuni, Japan
- Kōriyama, Japan
- Kushiro, Japan

Toyama

- Dubbo, Australia
- Durham, United States
- Mogi das Cruzes, Brazil

Toyohashi

- Panevėžys, Lithuania
- Toledo, United States

Toyokawa

- Cupertino, United States
- Xinwu (Wuxi), China

Toyonaka

- Okinawa, Japan
- San Mateo, United States

Toyota

- Derbyshire, England, United Kingdom
- Detroit, United States

=== Ts ===
Tsu

- Osasco, Brazil
- Zhenjiang, China

Tsubame

- Dundee, United States
- Sheboygan, United States

Tsuchiura

- Palo Alto, United States

Tsukuba

- Bochum, Germany
- Cambridge, United States
- Grenoble, France
- Irvine, United States
- Milpitas, United States
- Shenzhen, China

Tsuruga

- Donghae, South Korea
- Nakhodka, Russia
- Taizhou, China

Tsushima

- Hercules, United States

Tsuyama

- Miyakojima, Japan
- Santa Fe, United States

== U ==
Ube

- Castellón de la Plana, Spain
- Newcastle, Australia
- Weihai, China

Uchiko

- Rothenburg ob der Tauber, Germany
- Wasilla, United States

Ueda

- Broomfield, United States
- Davos, Switzerland
- Jōetsu, Japan
- Kamakura, Japan
- Kudoyama, Japan
- Toyooka, Japan

Uji

- Kamloops, Canada
- Nuwara Eliya, Sri Lanka
- Xianyang, China

Unzen

- Gurye, South Korea

Urasoe

- Quanzhou, China

Urayasu

- Orlando, United States

Ushiku

- Greve in Chianti, Italy
- Hitachiōta, Japan
- Orange, Australia
- Shikama, Japan
- Whitehorse, Canada

Utsunomiya

- Auckland, New Zealand
- Orléans, France
- Qiqihar, China
- Tulsa, United States

Uwajima

- Chikuma, Japan
- Honolulu, United States
- Ōsaki, Japan
- Sendai, Japan
- Tōbetsu, Japan
- Xiangshan, China

== W ==
Wakayama

- Bakersfield, United States
- Jeju City, South Korea
- Jinan, China
- Richmond, Canada

Wakō

- Longview, United States

Warabi

- El Dorado County, United States

== Y ==
Yachiyo

- Tyler, United States

Yaizu

- Hobart, Australia

Yamagata

- Boulder, United States
- Jilin City, China
- Kitzbühel, Austria
- Swan Hill, Australia
- Ulan-Ude, Russia

Yamaguchi

- Changwon, South Korea
- Gongju, South Korea
- Jinan, China
- Pamplona, Spain

Yamato

- Gwangmyeong, South Korea

Yao

- Bellevue, United States

Yatsushiro

- Beihai, China
- Keelung, Taiwan

Yawata

- Baoji, China
- Milan, United States

Yoichi

- East Dunbartonshire, Scotland, United Kingdom

Yokkaichi

- Long Beach, United States
- Tianjin, China

Yokohama

- Constanţa, Romania
- Lyon, France
- Manila, Philippines
- Mumbai, India
- Odesa, Ukraine
- San Diego, United States
- Shanghai, China
- Vancouver, Canada

Yokosuka

- Brest, France
- Corpus Christi, United States
- Fremantle, Australia
- Medway, England, United Kingdom

Yonago

- Baoding, China
- Sokcho, South Korea

Yoshikawa

- Lake Oswego, United States

Yotsukaidō

- Livermore, United States

Yugawara

- Chungju, South Korea
- Port Stephens, Australia

== Z ==
Zama

- Smyrna, United States
