= Reutte Friary =

- Franziskanerkloster Reutte
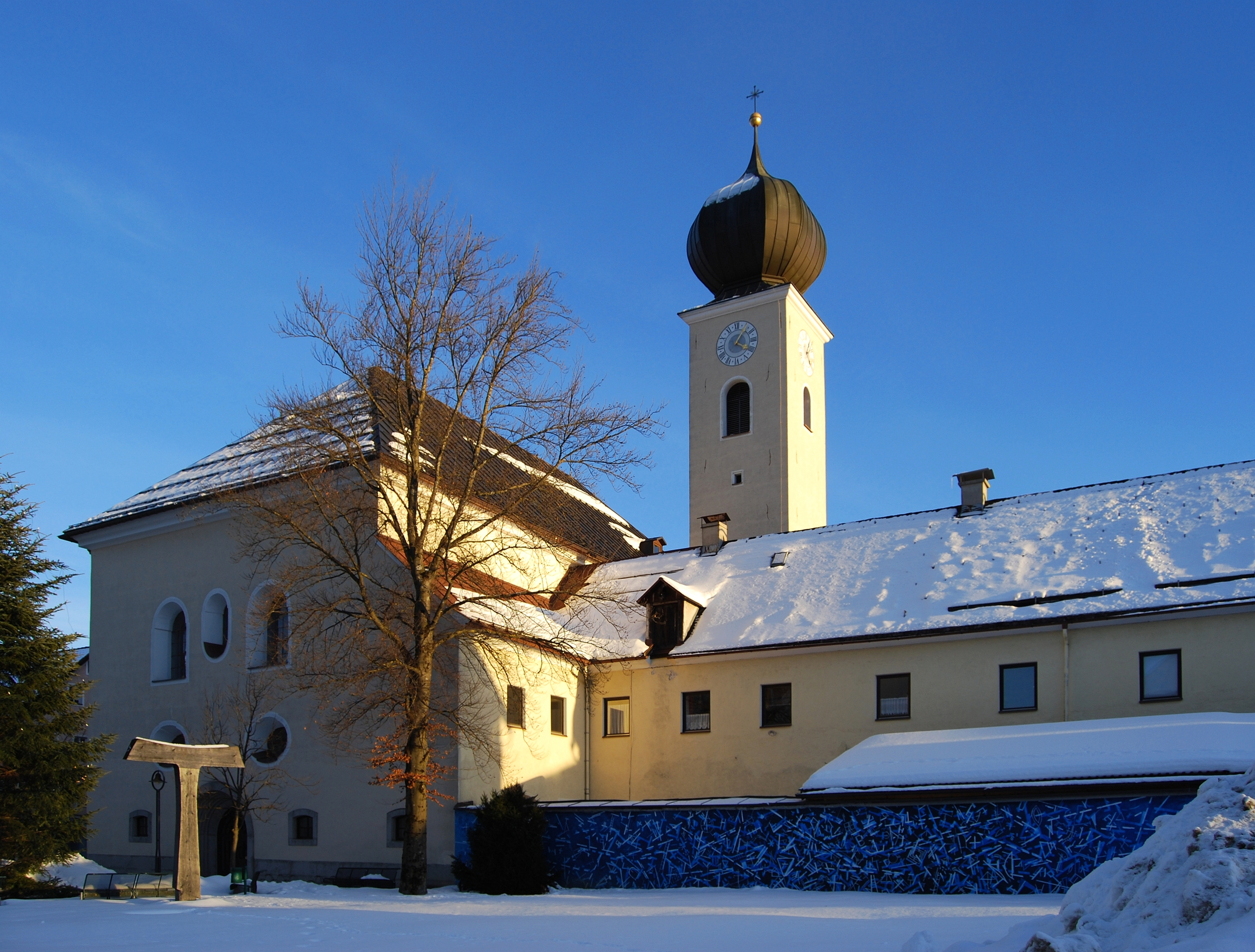
- Friary Church, Reutte (2011)

- Location within Austria

General information
- Location: Reutte, Tirol, Austria
- Coordinates: 47°29′18″N 10°43′6″E

Reutte Friary is a former Roman Catholic Franciscan religious community and its associated church in the market town of Reutte in the Austrian Tirol, some 100 km (60 miles) to the west of Innsbruck. The church and the conventual complex of which it is a part enjoy Protected Monument status under Austrian law. The last Franciscans left the friary at the end of 2014, however, as part of a more general retrenchment, following several decades of decline in the numbers coming forward as novices.

== History ==
The foundation stone of the Franciscan settlement was laid on 15 March 1628 in the presence of Archduke Leopold of Austria and his wife, born Claudia de' Medici. Political context was provided by the fight-back of the Catholic Church in the face of the sixteenth-century Protestant Reformation. The Franciscans were also given the adjacent Church of St Anna for their pastoral work. The friary was completed in 1630. However, in July 1632 both the conventual buildings and the church were damaged and looted by Swedish soldiers as part of the devastation associated with the Thirty Years' War.

In 1703 and again in 1846 the complex burned down, but on both occasions it was rebuilt with financial support from the local community. During the eighteenth century the friary was home to a Franciscan theological study centre. Between 1775 and 1782 the Franciscans provided military chaplains for Ehrenberg Castle. From 1820 till 1861 Reutte served as a community for novices.

Population change in the region caused the friary church at Reutte to recruit its own full-time minister in 1945. In order to provide a location for parish meetings, the "Paulusheim" was built between 1959 and 1961, following which, the church was renovated in stages during the middle 1960s. The belfry was replaced in 1976, and between 1977 and 2000 Reutte again housed novices for the Franciscan Tirol Province.

By the second decade of the 21st century there were only four Franciscans left, devoting their time chiefly to hospital work and pastoral care in the parish. On 8 October 2013 an announcement was received that Reutte Friary would close in September 2014.

== Friary Church of St. Anna ==
The church, of sober Franciscan design, is positioned parallel to the street and is integrated into the other friary buildings. The Gothic choir is supported by a Baroque nave under a hip roof. The tower is positioned on the south side of the choir, partly overlapping into the conventual building; it features arched windows and is topped off with an onion dome characteristic of churches in the region. The nave and choir are also lit through round-arched windows.
