= Archbach =

Archbach, also: Planseeache
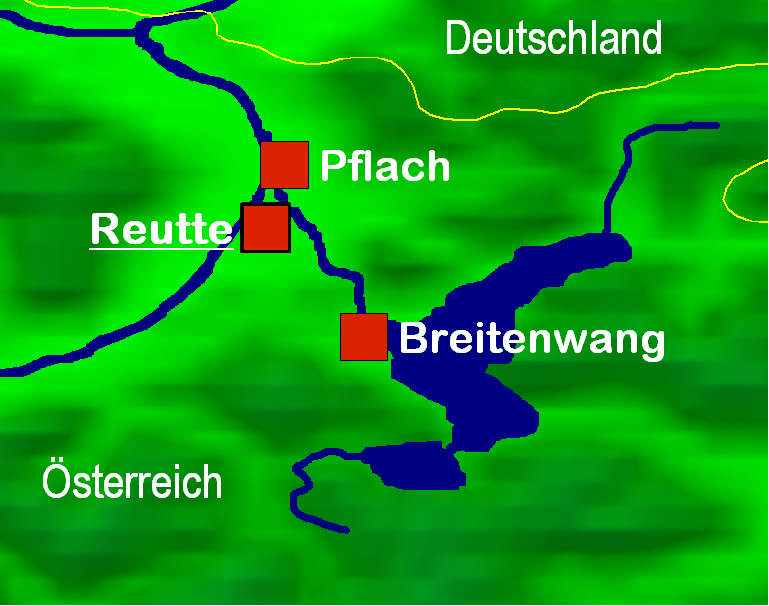
- Course of the Archbach

- Location of mouth in Austria

Location
- Country: Austria
- State: Tyrol

Physical characteristics
- Source
  - location: Plansee
  - coordinates: 47.4795°N 10.7728°E
- Mouth
  - location: Lech at Pflach
  - coordinates: 47.5130°N 10.7122°E
- Length: 7.0 km (4.3 mi)

Basin features
- Progression: Lech→ Danube→ Black Sea

The Archbach, also called Planseeache, is a river of Tyrol, Austria.

The Archbach is a 7 km (4.3 mi) long. It arises from the lake Plansee in Breitenwang. It flows northeastward to Reutte and furtheron to Pflach where it discharges into the Lech.
