= Geierköpfe =

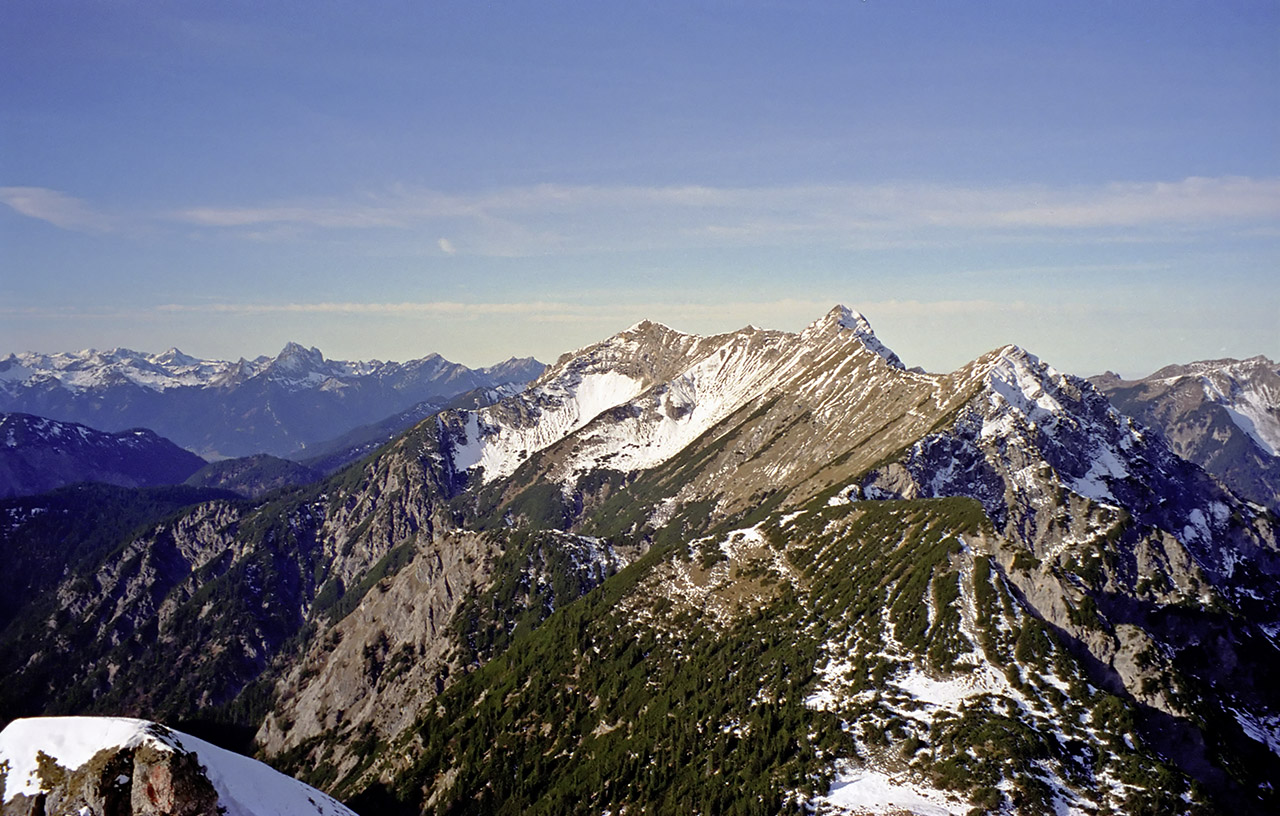
- The Geierköpfe from the south (l to r: West, Main and East Top)

Highest point
- Elevation: 2,161 m (AA) (7,090 ft)
- Prominence: 2,161-1,666 m ↓ Neualm Saddle
- Isolation: 3.3 km → Kreuzspitze
- Coordinates: 47°31′11″N 10°52′30″E

Geography
- Location within Austria
- Location: Tyrol, Austria
- Parent range: Ammergau Alps

Geology
- Rock age: Uppermost Carnian - Norian
- Rock type: main dolomite

Climbing
- Normal route: Plansee - Zwerchenbergalm - West Top

The Geierköpfe form a triple-summited mountain massif in the Ammergau Alps in Tyrol, Austria. The main summit is 2,161 m (AA) high, the West Top 2,143 m high and the East Top 2,060 m. The summit group is located southwest of the Ammer Saddle.

The West Top can be climbed either from the Plansee lake or from a small car park on the road linking the Plansee via the Ammer Saddle to Schloss Linderhof (ca. 2 km south of Hotel Ammerwald on the bridge over the Teufelsbach) in about 3½ hours. This is an easy mountain tour; only at a few places just below the summit is there a requirement to use hands as well as feet.

The crossing from West Top to the main summit is rather more challenging and requires sure-footedness and a head for heights.

The arête walk from the main summit to the East Top requires sure-footed negotiation of schrofen terrain and, at one spot, climbing to grade II standard and is only recommended for experienced mountaineers.

The West Top can also be ascended from the Ammer Saddle as an interesting ski tour. Because of the dense belt of mountain pine, however, a high level of snow is needed. The descent from the gully at the exit to the cirque on the north side is sometimes rather tricky. If there is little snow (when it is very steep) or the snow is hard, ice picks and crampons are recommended.

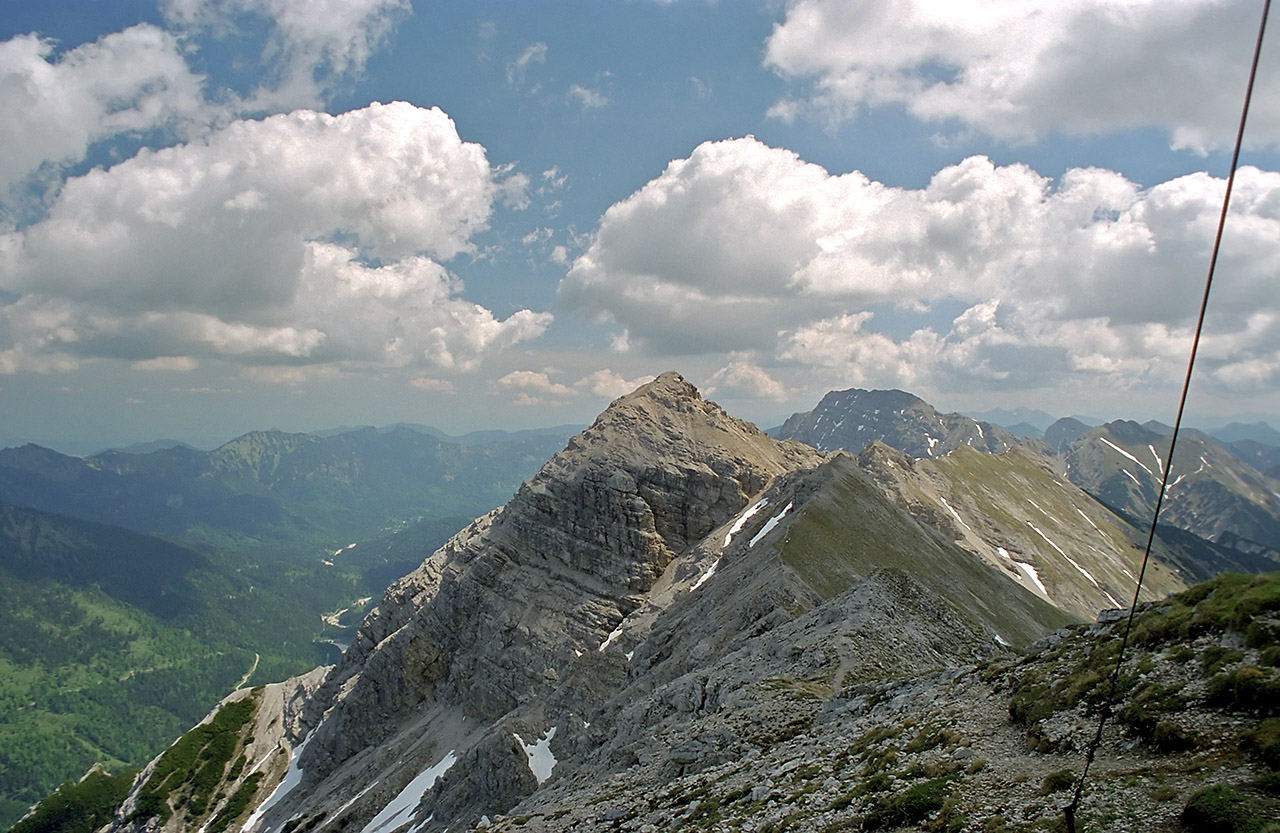
Geierköpfe Main Top, seen from the West Top

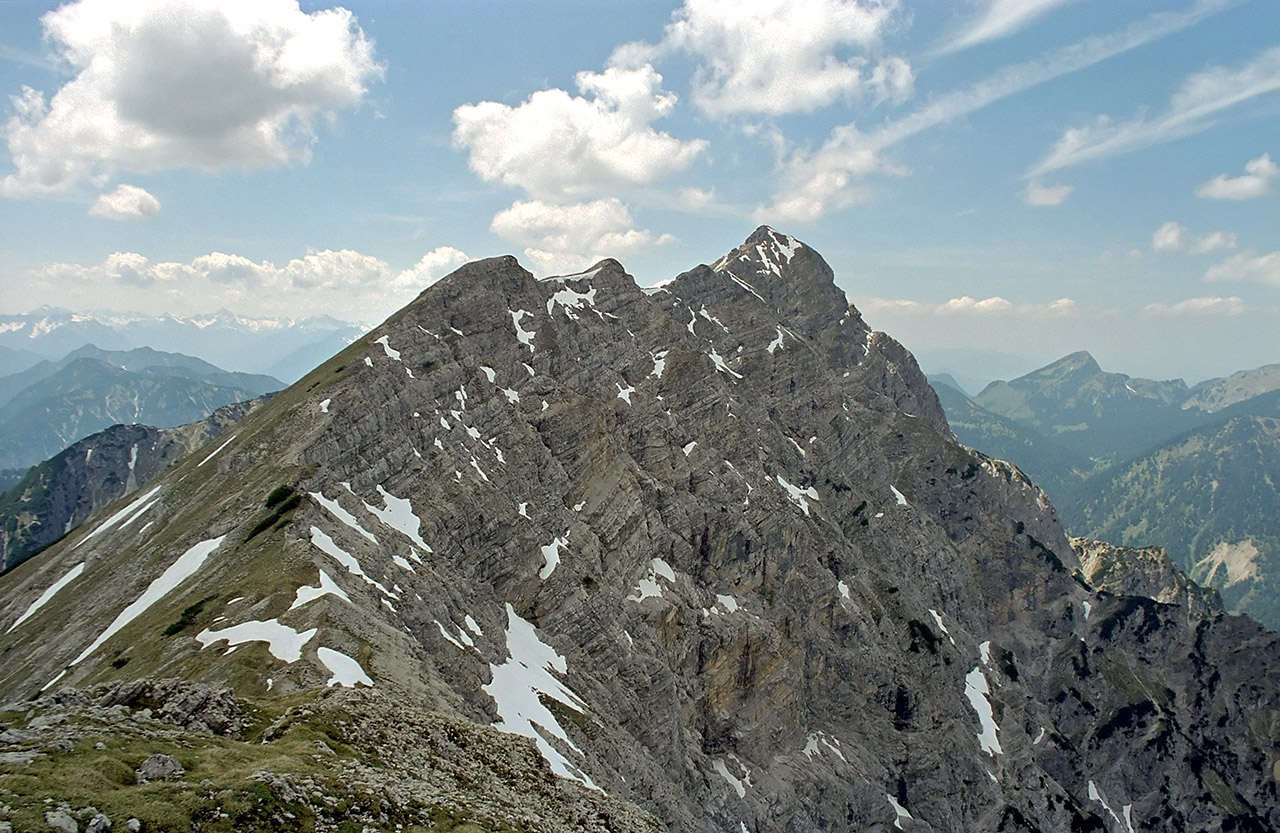
Geierköpfe Main Top, seen from the East Top

== Literature ==
- Dieter Seibert: AVF Allgäuer Alpen und Ammergauer Alpen, Rother Verlag, Munich, 2004, ISBN 3-7633-1126-2
