= Breitenwang =

- Municipality
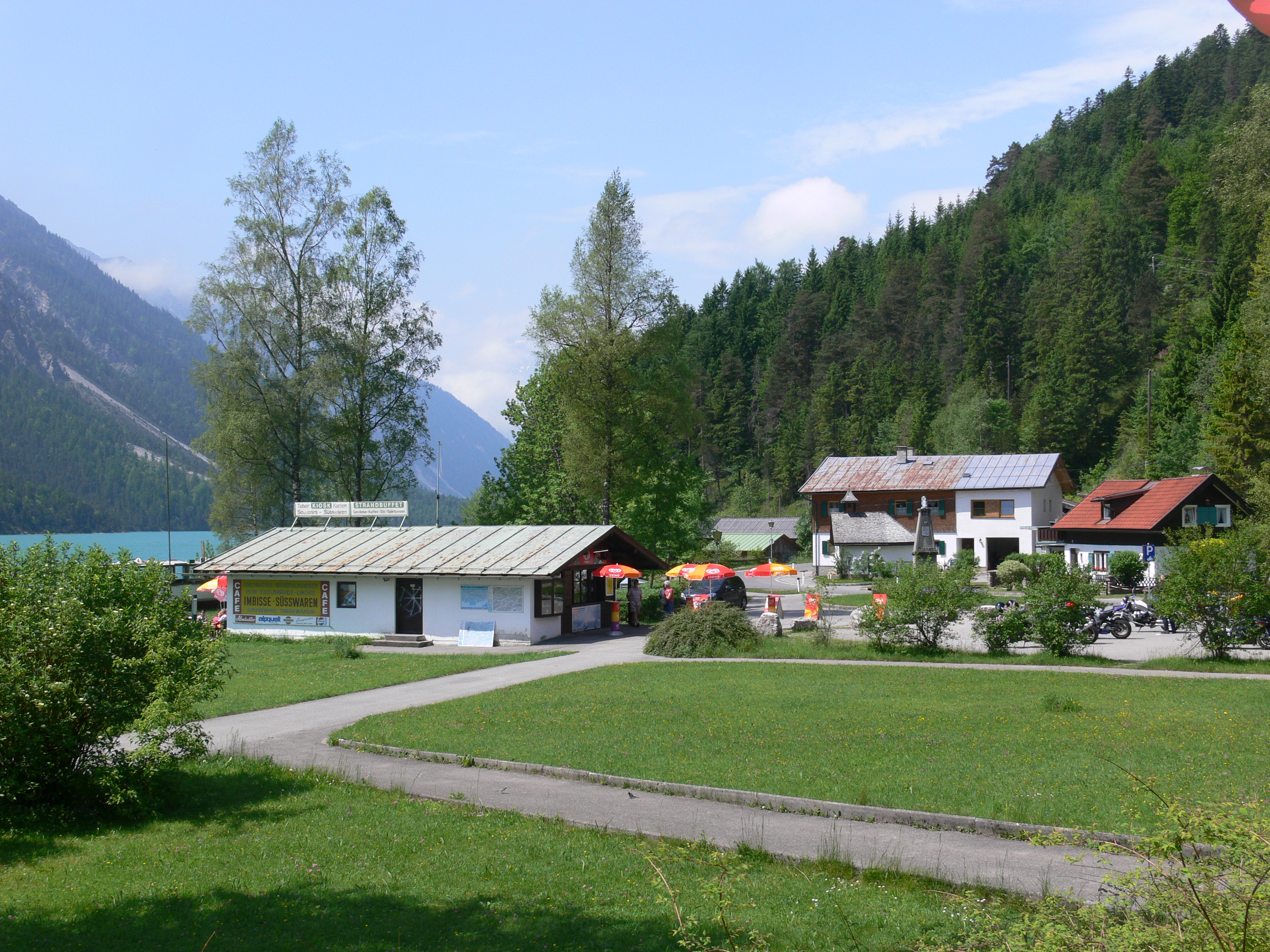

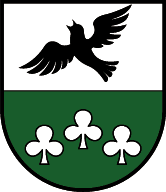
- Coat of arms

- Location within Austria
- Coordinates: 47°29′20″N 10°43′40″E
- Country: Austria
- State: Tyrol
- District: Reutte

Government
  - Mayor: Hans-Peter Wagner

Area
  - Total: 18.94 km^{2} (7.31 sq mi)
- Elevation: 850 m (2,790 ft)

Population (2021)
  - Total: 1,479
  - Density: 78.09/km^{2} (202.2/sq mi)
- Time zone: UTC+1 (CET)
  - Summer (DST): UTC+2 (CEST)
- Postal code: 6600
- Area code: 05672
- Vehicle registration: RE
- Website: www.breitenwang. tirol.gv.at

Breitenwang is a municipality and village in the district of Reutte in the Austrian state of Tyrol.

== Geography ==
=== Geographical location ===
Breitenwang is located in the Reutte basin adjacent to the city on the Plansee and is closely interwoven with this community infrastructural. The cluster village consists of the districts Breitenwang, Lähn, Mühl, Neumühl and Plansee. Part of the Plansee belongs to the municipality, in which the Archbach springs from the Plansee.

=== Neighboring communities ===
Breitenwang has only two neighboring communities: Heiterwang in the south and Reutte in the west, north and east.

== History ==
Breitenwang was first mentioned as "Breitinwanc" or "Breitenwanch" in 1094, when Duke Welf IV and his wife Judith transferred their possession to the welfische Hauskloster Altdorf-Weingarten. Originally larger and more significant than Reutte, this changed with the straightening of the course of the main road. From there, the place lost importance.

Emperor Lothar III. died in Breitenwang on December 4, 1137, on his return from Italy (second Romzug).

== Culture and sights ==
- Catholic parish church Breitenwang Hll. Peter and Paul: The church was built around 1650. The ceiling fresco in the choir room depicting the "key handover to Peter" from 1755 was by Johann Jakob Zeiller. In the sacristy are four rococo silver reliquary busts depicting the apostles Peter and Paul as well as the two plague patrons Sebastian and Rochus. In the Chapel of the Resurrection a dance of the dead in stucco medallions can be seen (about 1725).
- The mortuary chapel Ad Beatam Virginem Mariam Dolorosam, which was added to the tower of the parish church of St. Peter and St. Paul in 1732, was given a dance of death by the sculptor and plasterer Thomas Seitz from 1724 to 1728. In medallions adorned with tendrils is shown how the death of ten people begins the last dance. The mortals are identified by their insignia and attributes; texts or names are omitted. On the left wall: Pope, Moses, wife, landlord, beggar; on the right wall: emperor, law teacher, soldier, cooper, farmer. The furnishings also include: stucco reliefs in the spandrels of the choir dome and further reliefs in the groove between the wall and dome base; Ceiling painting by Reuttener painter Paul Zeiller; Sculptures by the Füssen sculptor Anton Sturm.

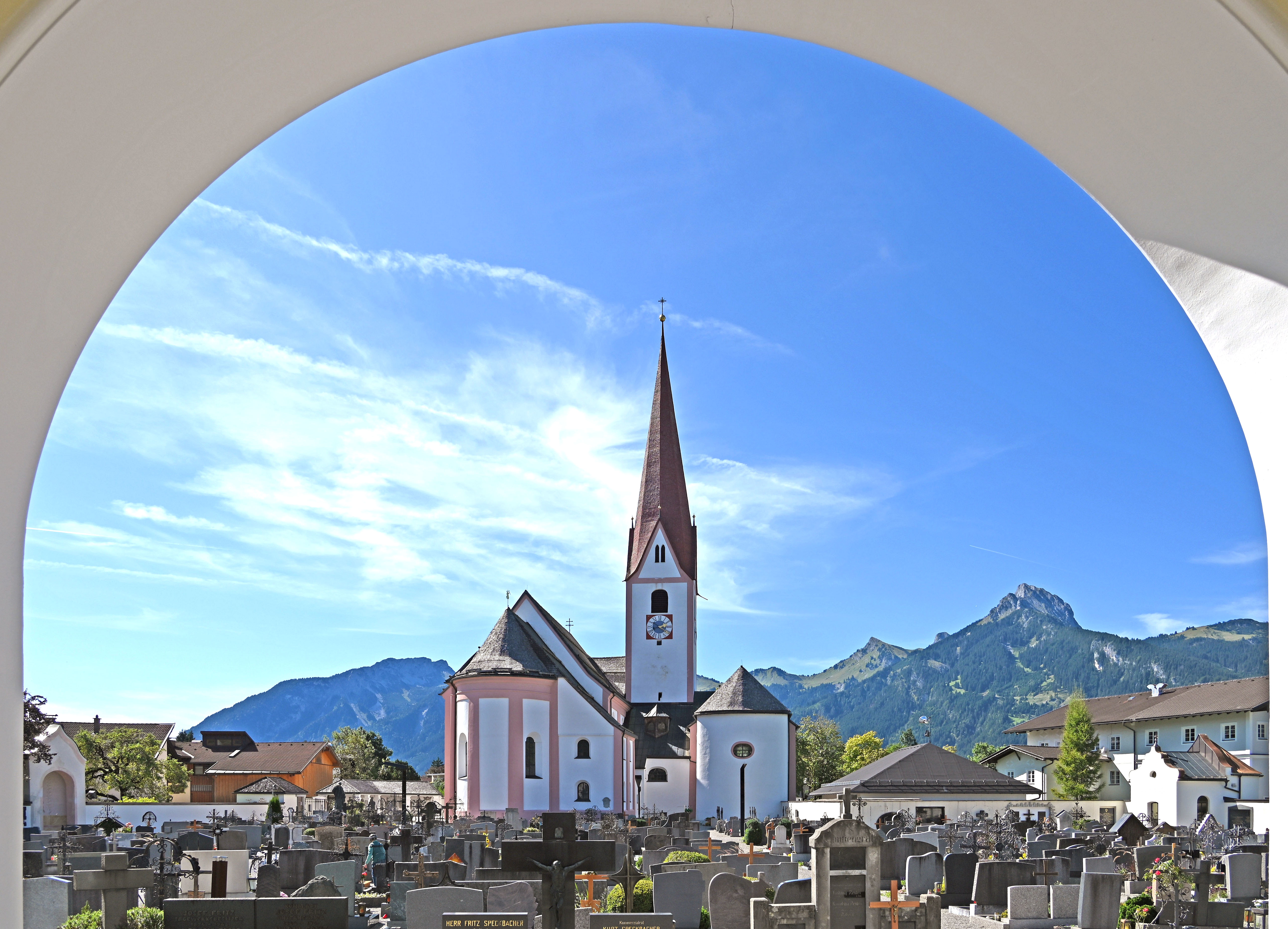
Breitenwang, church: Dekanatskirche heilige Petrus und Paulus
