= Shiraoi =

Town in Hokkaido, Japan

Shiraoi 白老町
- Town
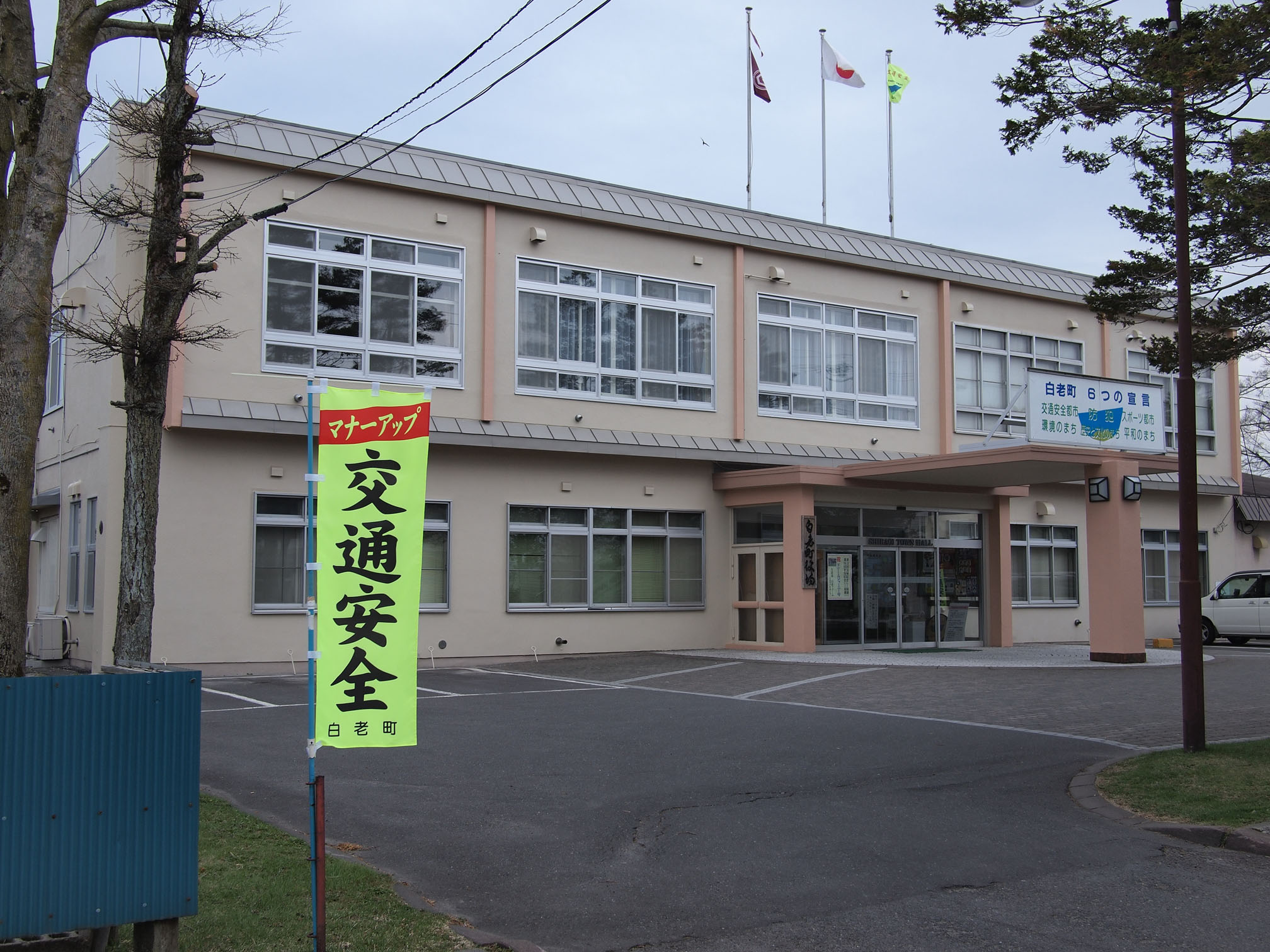
- Shiraoi town hall

- Flag Logo

- Location of Shiraoi in Hokkaido (Iburi Subprefecture)

- Location in Japan
- Coordinates: 42°33′N 141°21′E
- Country: Japan
- Region: Hokkaido
- Prefecture: Hokkaido (Iburi Subprefecture)
- District: Shiraoi

Area
  - Total: 425.75 km^{2} (164.38 sq mi)

Population (September 30, 2016)
  - Total: 17,759
  - Density: 41.712/km^{2} (108.03/sq mi)
- Time zone: UTC+09:00 (JST)
- City hall address: 1-1-1 Ōmachi, Shiraoi-chō, Shiraoi-gun, Hokkaidō; 059-0995
- Climate: Dfb
- Website: www.town.shiraoi.hokkaido.jp
- Symbols
- Flower: Lespedeza bicolor (エゾヤマハギ, Ezo-yama-hagi)
- Tree: Sorbus commixta (ナナカマド, Nanakamado)

Shiraoi (Japanese: 白老町, Hepburn: Shiraoi-chō) is a town located in Iburi, Hokkaido, Japan. As of September 2016, the town had a population of 17,759. It was established in 1867 by the feudal lords of Sendai. Most of the area of the town is forested and parts lie within the Shikotsu-Tōya National Park.

== History ==
Shiraoi, like the rest of Hokkaido, was populated by the Ainu. According to the town's official website, the name, Shiraoi, means "rainbows" in the Ainu language. Other sources state that the name comes from Shiraunai meaning "horse-flies".

In 1867, the Sendai domain established a fort in Shiraoi and work began on Shiogama Shrine (塩釜神社, Shiogama Jinja). The following year the Boshin War caused Sendai to retreat from Shiraoi and return to Sendai proper. After the revolt was put down the government dismantled the fort in 1870.

The end of the 19th century saw expansion of the town. A road was established connecting Shiraoi with Muroran, Sapporo, and Hakodate in 1873. Nineteen years later, the first railroad station was established. The villages of Shadai and Shikiu were established. Two significant events occurred during this expansion: in 1874, Mount Tarumae erupted, and in 1881, the Emperor Meiji visited.

== Geography ==
The total area is 425.72 square kilometres (164.37 sq mi). The town is 28.0 kilometres (17.4 mi) East to West and 26.4 kilometres (16.4 mi) North to South. 82% of this area is forested.

Land Use 2006
Use	Percentage
Mountains and forest	74
Other	9
Plains and moor	6
Ranchland	4
Farmland	2
Housing	2
Mixed use	2
Wet lands	1

Shiraoi is crossed by a number of rivers running from the mountains like Mount Horohoro to the Pacific Ocean. These include:

- Shadai River
- Shiraoi River
- Shikyu River
- Betsubetsu River

Mount Horohoro and Lake Kuttara are part of Shikotsu-Tōya National Park. Lake Poroto is also in the area.

=== Climate ===
Shiraoi has an oceanic climate, mild when compared to the rest of Hokkaido. The annual temperature ranges between the extremes of 33.3 °C (91.9 °F) and −20.8 °C (−5.4 °F). The average annual temperature is 7.2 °C (45.0 °F). Shiraoi receives 1,660 millimetres (65 in) of precipitation annually. This only results in 103 centimetres (41 in) of snow annually. In a typical year, the snow lingers for 80 days. Accumulated snow rarely exceeding 44 centimetres (17 in). Wind velocity averages merely 1.6 metres per second (3.6 mph), that is less than half of the neighboring Tomakomai and Muroran.

Climate data for Shiraoi (1991–2020 normals, extremes 1977–present)
Month	Jan	Feb	Mar	Apr	May	Jun	Jul	Aug	Sep	Oct	Nov	Dec	Year
Record high °C (°F)	8.4 (47.1)	10.7 (51.3)	16.1 (61.0)	23.8 (74.8)	28.5 (83.3)	31.1 (88.0)	33.3 (91.9)	33.1 (91.6)	30.9 (87.6)	26.9 (80.4)	19.0 (66.2)	14.5 (58.1)	33.3 (91.9)
Mean daily maximum °C (°F)	0.5 (32.9)	0.9 (33.6)	4.3 (39.7)	9.5 (49.1)	13.9 (57.0)	17.2 (63.0)	21.0 (69.8)	23.3 (73.9)	21.6 (70.9)	16.1 (61.0)	9.2 (48.6)	2.7 (36.9)	11.7 (53.0)
Daily mean °C (°F)	−3.7 (25.3)	−3.3 (26.1)	0.2 (32.4)	4.9 (40.8)	9.7 (49.5)	13.8 (56.8)	17.9 (64.2)	20.0 (68.0)	17.2 (63.0)	11.0 (51.8)	4.6 (40.3)	−1.4 (29.5)	7.6 (45.6)
Mean daily minimum °C (°F)	−8.6 (16.5)	−8.5 (16.7)	−4.4 (24.1)	0.3 (32.5)	5.6 (42.1)	10.8 (51.4)	15.4 (59.7)	17.1 (62.8)	12.8 (55.0)	5.7 (42.3)	−0.2 (31.6)	−5.8 (21.6)	3.4 (38.0)
Record low °C (°F)	−19.4 (−2.9)	−20.8 (−5.4)	−16.7 (1.9)	−10.5 (13.1)	−2.8 (27.0)	0.2 (32.4)	5.6 (42.1)	8.1 (46.6)	2.3 (36.1)	−3.1 (26.4)	−11.6 (11.1)	−16.5 (2.3)	−20.8 (−5.4)
Average precipitation mm (inches)	34.1 (1.34)	35.9 (1.41)	61.3 (2.41)	89.3 (3.52)	155.6 (6.13)	149.2 (5.87)	207.8 (8.18)	230.5 (9.07)	206.9 (8.15)	134.1 (5.28)	88.5 (3.48)	56.8 (2.24)	1,450 (57.09)
Average snowfall cm (inches)	68 (27)	76 (30)	56 (22)	5 (2.0)	0 (0)	0 (0)	0 (0)	0 (0)	0 (0)	0 (0)	4 (1.6)	40 (16)	253 (100)
Average precipitation days (≥ 1.0 mm)	6.5	6.1	8.1	9.2	10.7	10.2	13.2	13.2	11.9	10.6	9.9	7.8	117.4
Average snowy days	9.1	10.7	8.4	0.7	0.1	0	0	0	0	0	0.5	5.7	35.2
Mean monthly sunshine hours	153.3	155.3	178.8	185.2	183.0	129.8	108.7	131.7	158.5	159.3	140.1	136.6	1,820.4
Source: JMA

== Demographics ==
Shiraoi has a density of 42 persons per km^{2}.

Historic Population
Year	Households	Population
1899	848	3659
1919	988	4906
1920	1906	6312
1925	1348	6849

== Economy ==
In the 1930s, Shiraoi began the cultivation of mushrooms, such as Shiitake, and mullet roe (or karasumi) at Kojohama. Shiraoi imported the knowledge of mullet roe production from Iwanai.

Shiraoi has been involved in the harvest of marine products such as the Horsehair crab and konbu. Because of dwindling resources, harvesting of hair crab has been reduced to a test operation from the middle of July until the middle of August.

Shiraoi introduced the raising of beef cattle from Shimane Prefecture in 1954. In 1966, Shiraoi began with the production of chicken eggs. Shiraoi boasts 550,000 chickens, and a business worth ¥2.8 billion.

== Arts and culture ==
=== Annual cultural events ===
Shiraoi has four annual festivals:

- Shiraoi Dosanko Winter Festival — early February
- Shiraoi Beef Festival — early June
- Shiraoi Port Festival — early August
- Shiraoi Cheipu Festival — early September

=== Museums and other points of interest ===
- The National Ainu Museum, commonly known as Poroto Kotan – A natural history museum depicting a traditional Ainu village. Performers show traditional crafts and dances like the iomante rimse.
- Ayoro Beach
- Inkura Falls
- Kojohama hotsprings
- Lake Kuttara
- Mount Horohoro
- Ruin of the Sendai Domain Shiraoi Founding Encampment Historical Landmark (史跡仙台藩白老元陣屋跡, Shiseki Sendai-han Shiraoi Moto-jinya Ato)
- Sendai Domain Shiraoi Founding Encampment Resource Center (仙台藩白老元陣屋資料館, Sendai-han Shiraoi Moto-jinya Shiryōkan)

== Education ==
=== Elementary schools ===
- Hagino Elementary School (萩野小学校, Hagino Shōgakkō)
- Kojō Elementary School (虎杖小学校, Kojō Shōgakkō)
- Midorigaoka Elementary School (緑丘小学校, Midorigaoka Shōgakkō) – Closed in 2016
- Shadai Elementary School (社台小学校, Shadai Shōgakkō) – Closed in 2016
- Shiraoi Elementary School (白老小学校, Shiraoi Shōgakkō) – Merged in 2016 with Shadai, and Midorigaoka.
- Takeura Elementary School (竹浦小学校, Takeura Shōgakkō)

=== Middle schools ===
- Shiraoi Middle School (白老中学校, Shiraoi Chūgakkō)
- Hagino Middle School (萩野中学校, Hagino Chūgakkō) – Closed in 2013, now site of Hakusho Middle School
- Hakusho Middle School (白翔中学校, Hakusho Chūgakkō)
- Kojō Middle School (虎杖中学校, Kojō Chūgakkō) – Closed in 2013
- Takeura Middle School (竹浦中学校, Takeura Chūgakkō) – Closed in 2013

=== Other schools ===
- Education Support Center (教育支援センター, Kyōikushien Sentā)

== Infrastructure ==
=== Transportation ===
Shiraoi has several stations on the Muroran Main Line:

- Kojōhama
- Takeura
- Kita-yoshihara
- Hagino
- Shiraoi
- Shadai

Shiraoi is served by the following bus companies:

- Donan bus Co., Ltd
- Hokkaido Chuo Bus Co., Ltd.

Shiraoi is served by the following roads and highways:

- Hokkaidō Expressway
  - Interchange at Shiraoi
  - Parking area at Hagino
- National highways:
  - Japan National Route 36
- Prefectural roads:
  - Hokkaidō Highway 86
  - Hokkaidō Highway 350
  - Hokkaidō Highway 388
  - Hokkaidō Highway 701
  - Hokkaidō Highway 1045

== Sister cities ==
Shiraoi has the following twin city relationships:

- Quesnel, Canada since 1981
- Sendai, Japan since 1981
- Morita (now part of Tsugaru), Japan since 1991

== Sports ==
The Shadai Stallion Station is located here. Shadai Stallion Station has bought high-profile thoroughbreds for their breeding program, such as Kentucky Derby winner War Emblem.

== Notable people from Shiraoi ==
- Giichi Nomura, advocate and activist for the Ainu people
- Hiromi Yamamoto, speed skater
