= Hermann Stern =

Austrian Lawyer, politician and economic pioneer (1878 - 1952)

Dr. Hermann Stern
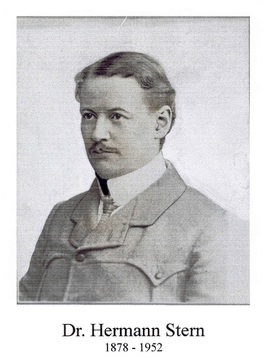
- A portrait of Hermann Stern
- Born: 24 May 1878; Bolzano, South Tyrol
- Died: 24 August 1952 (aged 74); Innsbruck, Austria
- Education: University of Innsbruck (Doctor of Law)
- Occupations: Lawyer; Politician
- Spouse: Anna Knittel (m. 1911)
- Parent(s): Johann Joachim Stern; Gertraud Stern, (née Lechthaler)

Hermann Stern (24 May 1878 – 24 August 1952) was an Austrian lawyer, local politician, and economic pioneer.

== Early life ==
Born in Bolzano, South Tyrol, as the seventh of ten children, Hermann was the son of Johann Joachim Stern, a Jew who converted to Catholicism, and Gertraud Stern née Lechthaler.

He received his law doctorate in 1902 from the University of Innsbruck, passing the bar exam in 1906. He became secretary of the Association of Catholic Agricultural Workers in Innsbruck. In 1910, he moved to Reutte (Tyrol, Austria) as a lawyer.

== Career ==
In 1918, Stern played a vital role in a democracy movement in Reutte that aimed to restructure the town in a gradual process. In 1919, he became a member of the municipal council of Reutte. There he held various positions until 1927, ultimately as the deputy mayor. Within the municipal council, he expanded the municipal power station in Reutte and established a hospital.

When sugar prices doubled on December 1, 1919, there were major conflicts because available sugar had not been distributed to the population before December 1. District authorities claimed that there was not enough sugar and that it was mainly needed for the sick. Research by the Social Democrats and Dr. Stern, found that the Schretter company owned almost ten times the declared amount of sugar. Through Stern's work, the sugar was confiscated and distributed to the population.

As an economic pioneer, he spurred the use of available resources, such as water, wood, and electricity, for an economic upswing. In 1922, he persuaded Paul Schwarzkopf to found the Plansee metal works, using the abundant electricity. He founded an oil plant resources and several wood processing companies.

In 1923, Stern was the executive director of the Tiroler Oelwerke LLC.

His main economic project was the construction of a cable car up to the Zugspitze. Its completion in 1926 brought him to the peak of his popularity. The project eventually failed due to the economic situation caused by the Nazi government's thousand-mark ban.

== Personal life ==
In 1911, he married Anna Knittel, the daughter of a school inspector, Josef Knittel. They gave birth to five children.

== Exile and death ==
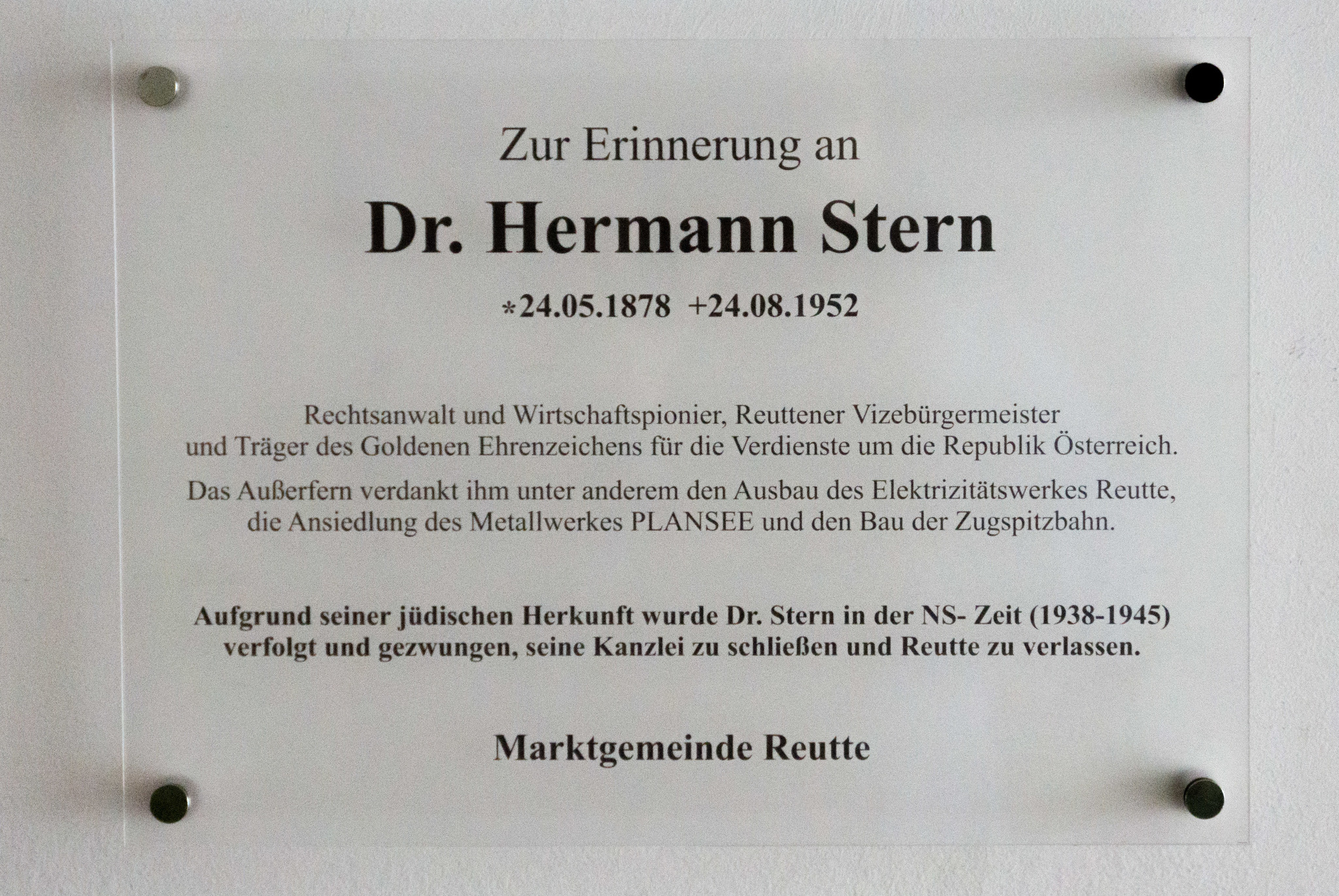
A memorial plaque by the market town of Reutte in the house where Dr. Hermann Stern lived.

In 1926, he was made an honorary citizen of the municipality of Ehrwald for the construction of the cable car up to the Zugspitze (de:Zugspitzbahn). This honorary citizenship was withdrawn in 1940 due to his Jewish descent. In 1938, German racial laws labelled him a "half-Jew." His offices were confiscated and he was imprisoned for 15 months. To exile him from Tyrol, Gauleiter Franz Hofer had him expelled to Nuremberg. Stern went blind, returned in 1945 as a seriously ill man, and tried in vain to be rehabilitated. He died in Innsbruck on August 24, 1952.

== Honor ==
In 1947, he was admitted to the bar again. His confiscation was expressly revoked by the municipality of Ehrwald in 1998. In 2017, the market municipality of Reutte unveiled a commemorative plaque in Hermann Stern's former home, which highlights some of his achievements.
