= Heiterwanger See =

Lake in Austria

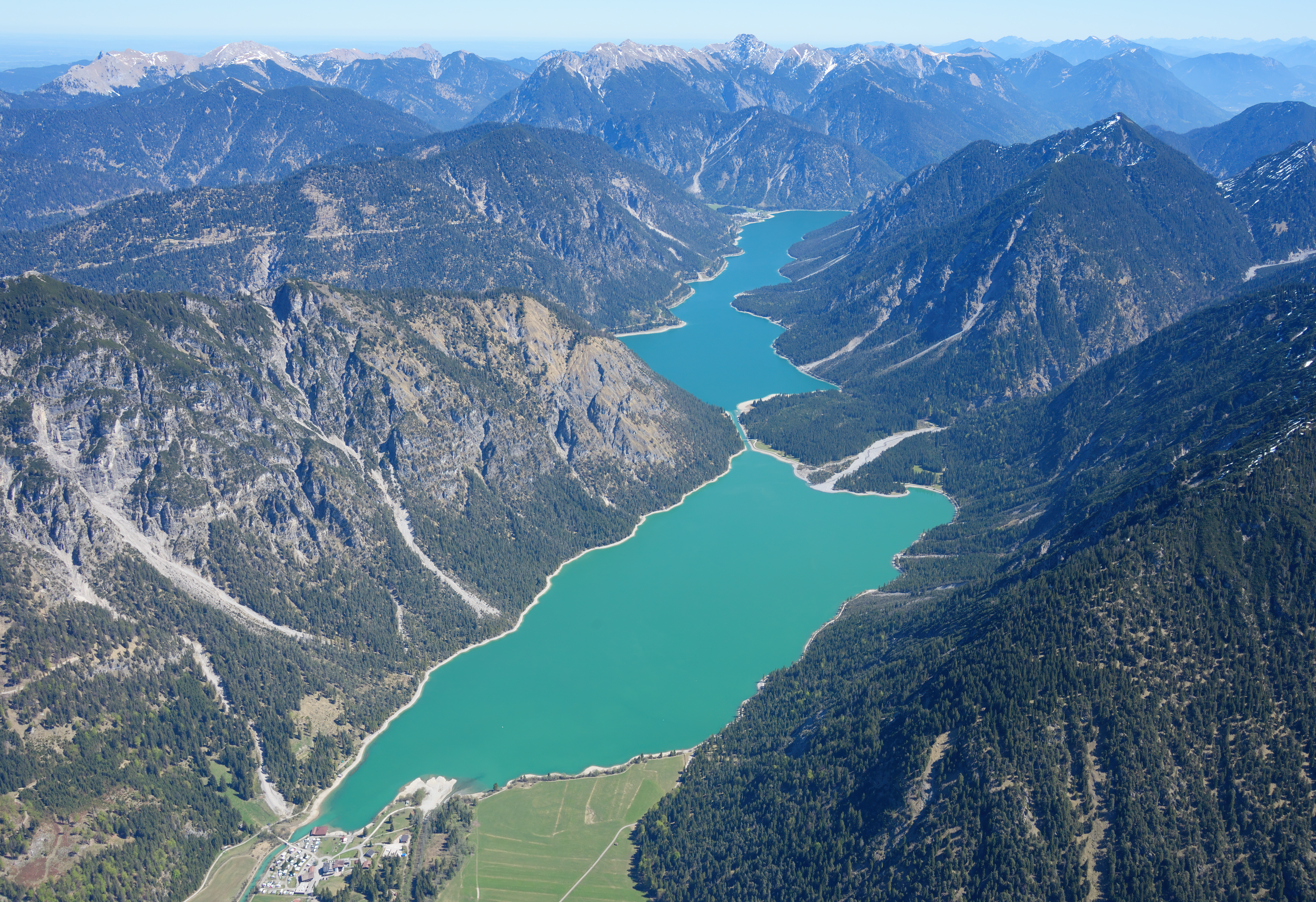
- Aerial image of Heiterwanger See with Plansee in the background

- Location within Austria
- Location: Tyrol
- Coordinates: 47°27′30″N 10°46′50″E
- Basin countries: Austria
- Surface area: 1.37 km^{2} (0.53 sq mi)
- Max. depth: 61 m (200 ft)
- Surface elevation: 976 m (3,202 ft)

Lake Heiterwang is a lake in the Tirol, Austria, located at 47°27′30″N 10°46′50″E. Its surface is approximately 1.37 km^{2} and its maximum depth is 61 metres. It is well-known that Heiterwanger See is good for fishing. Kaiser Maximilian I of Austria often fished here.

Together with Plansee, this lake forms the second largest body of water in Tirol.
