= Ehrenberg Castle =

Castle located in Reutte in Tyrol, Austria

Coordinates: 47°27′56″N 10°43′06″E

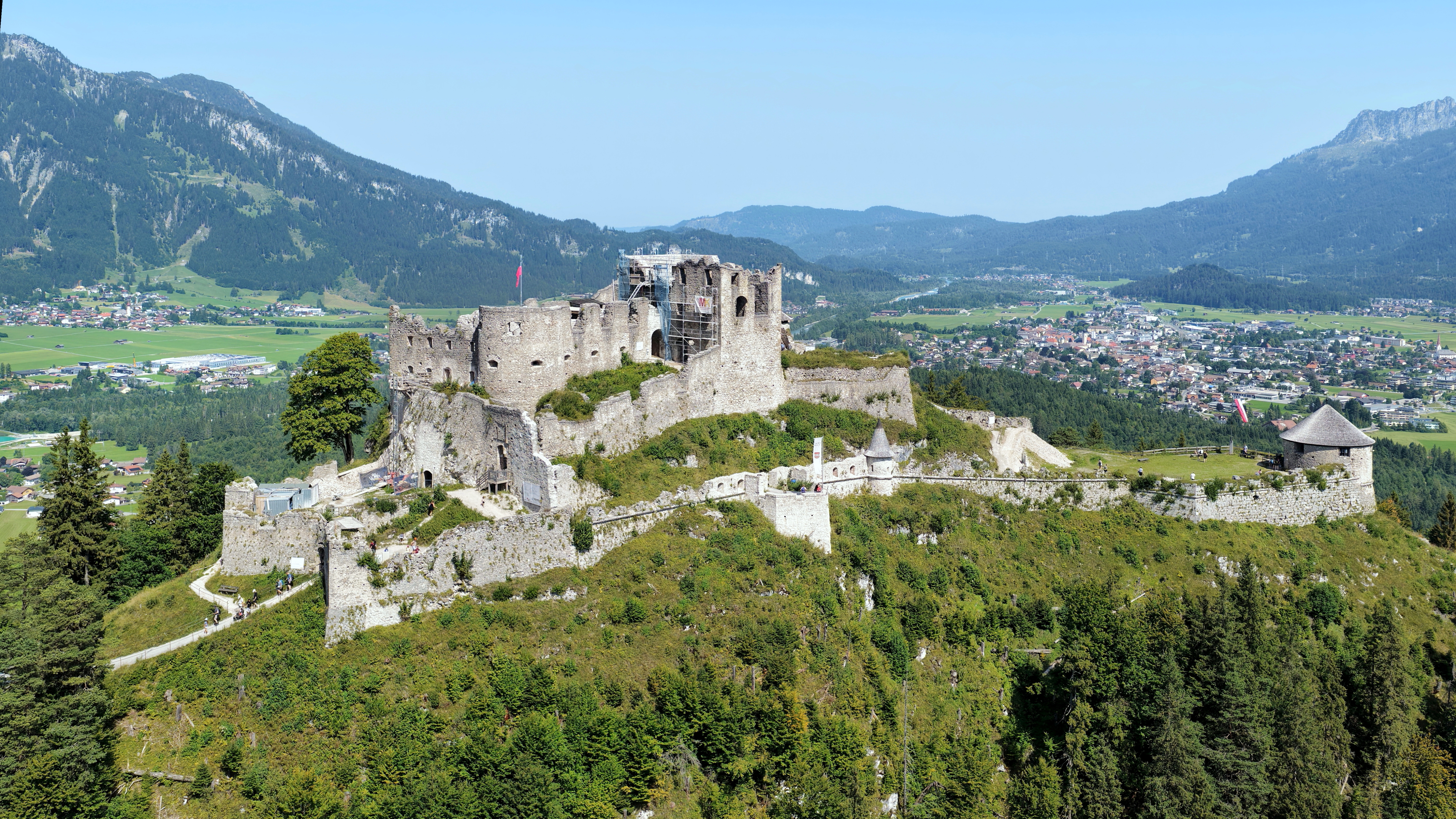
South view of the Ehrenberg castle ruins

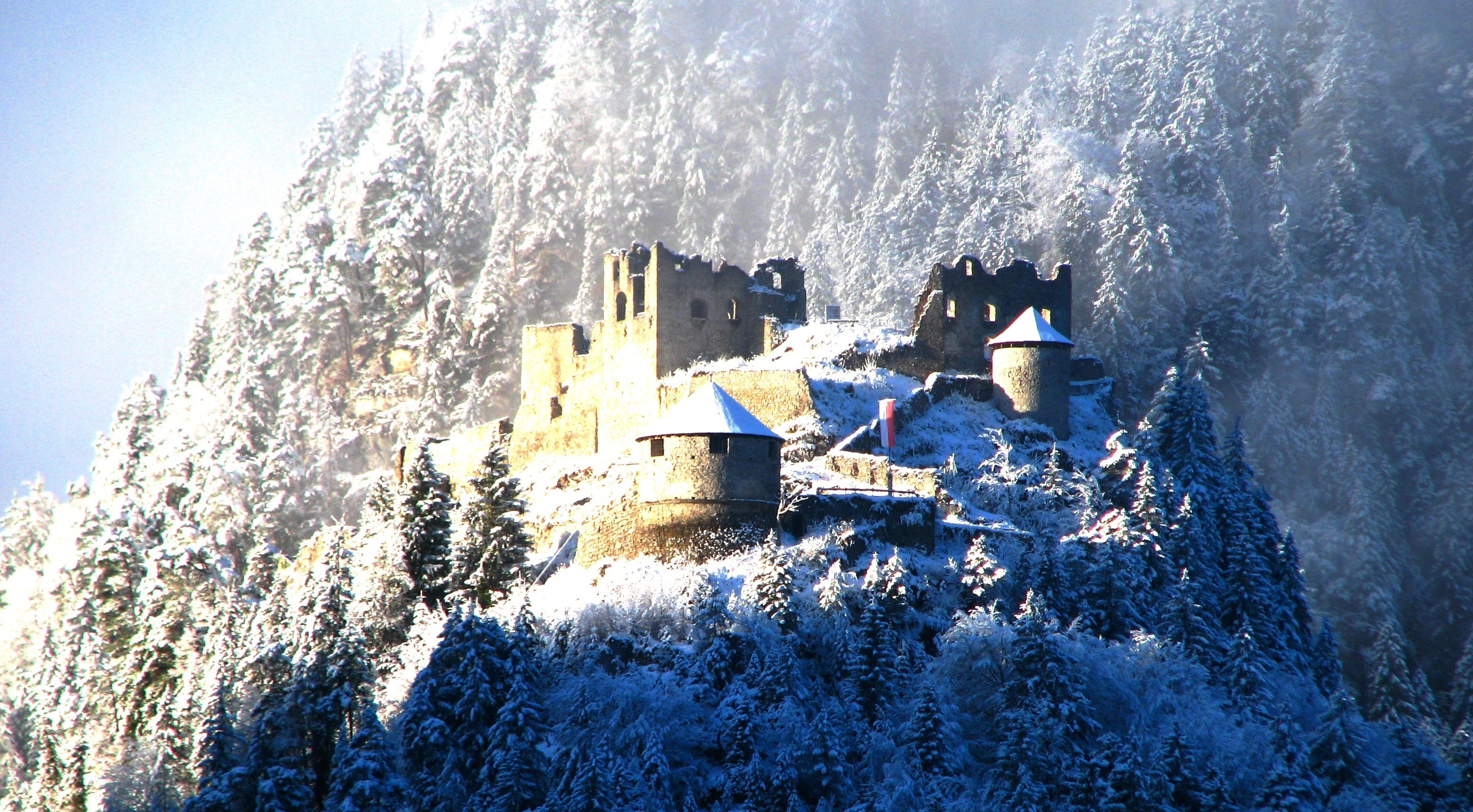
Ehrenberg Castle Ruins – December, 2013

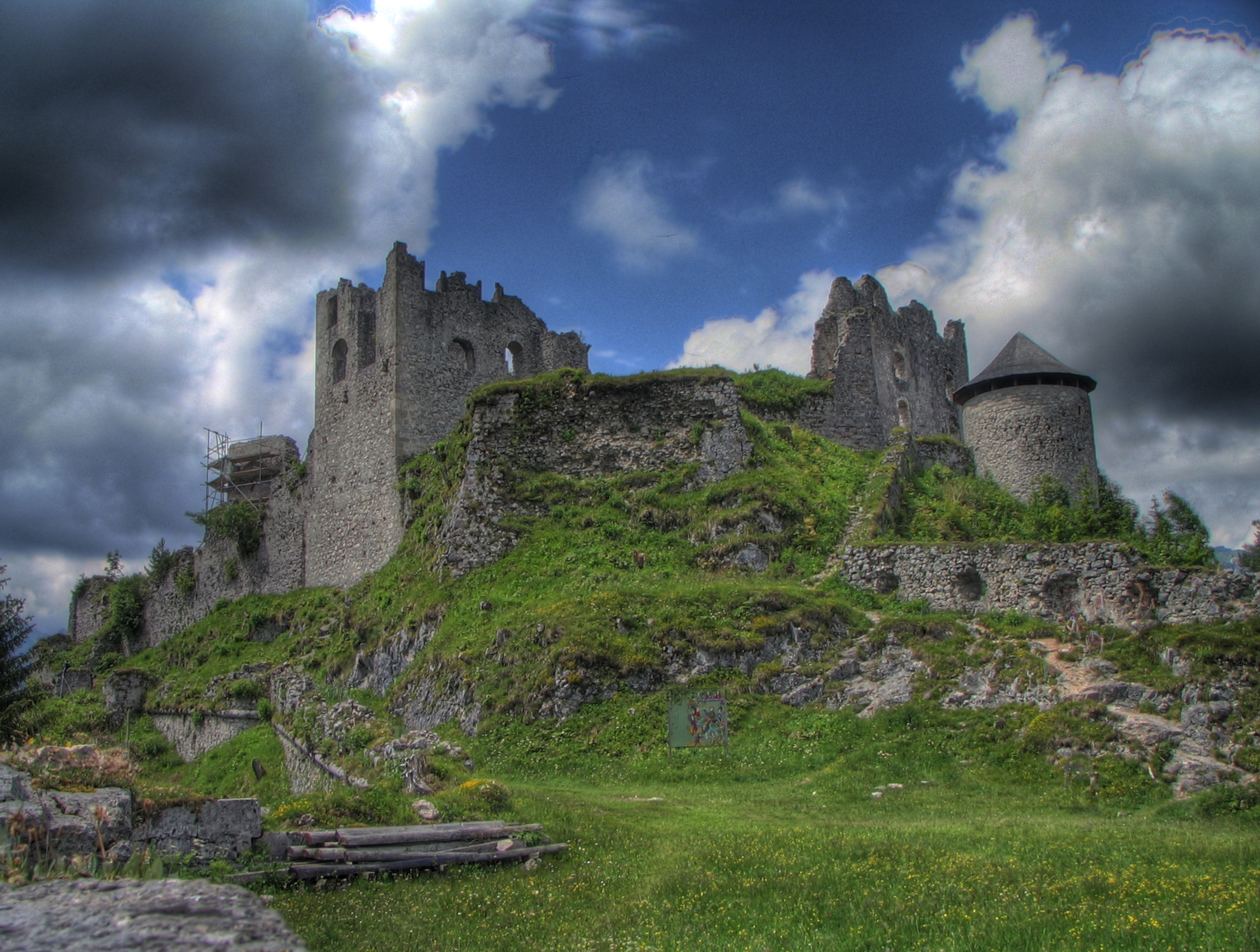
The castle from the south side

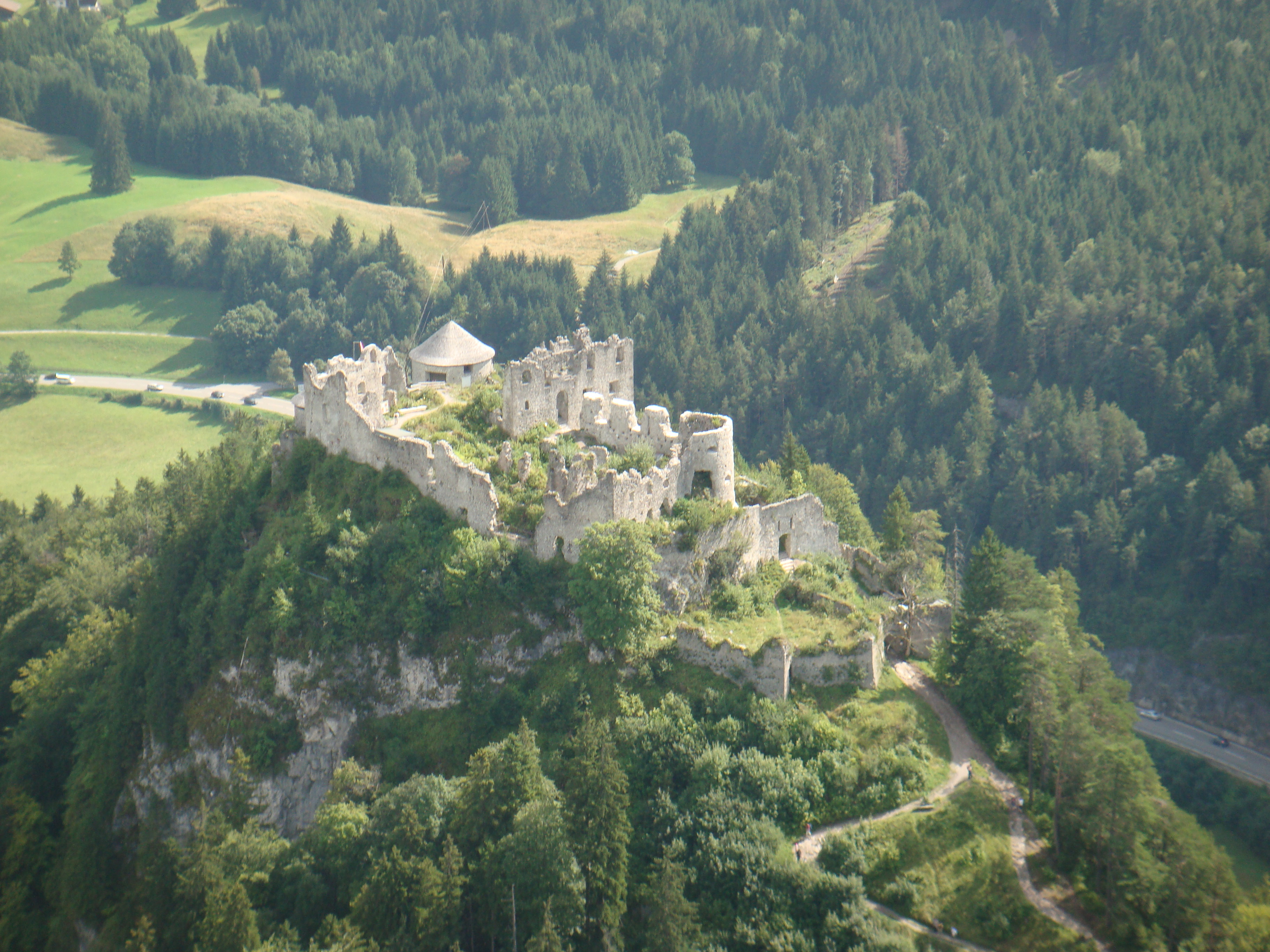
The castle from the air

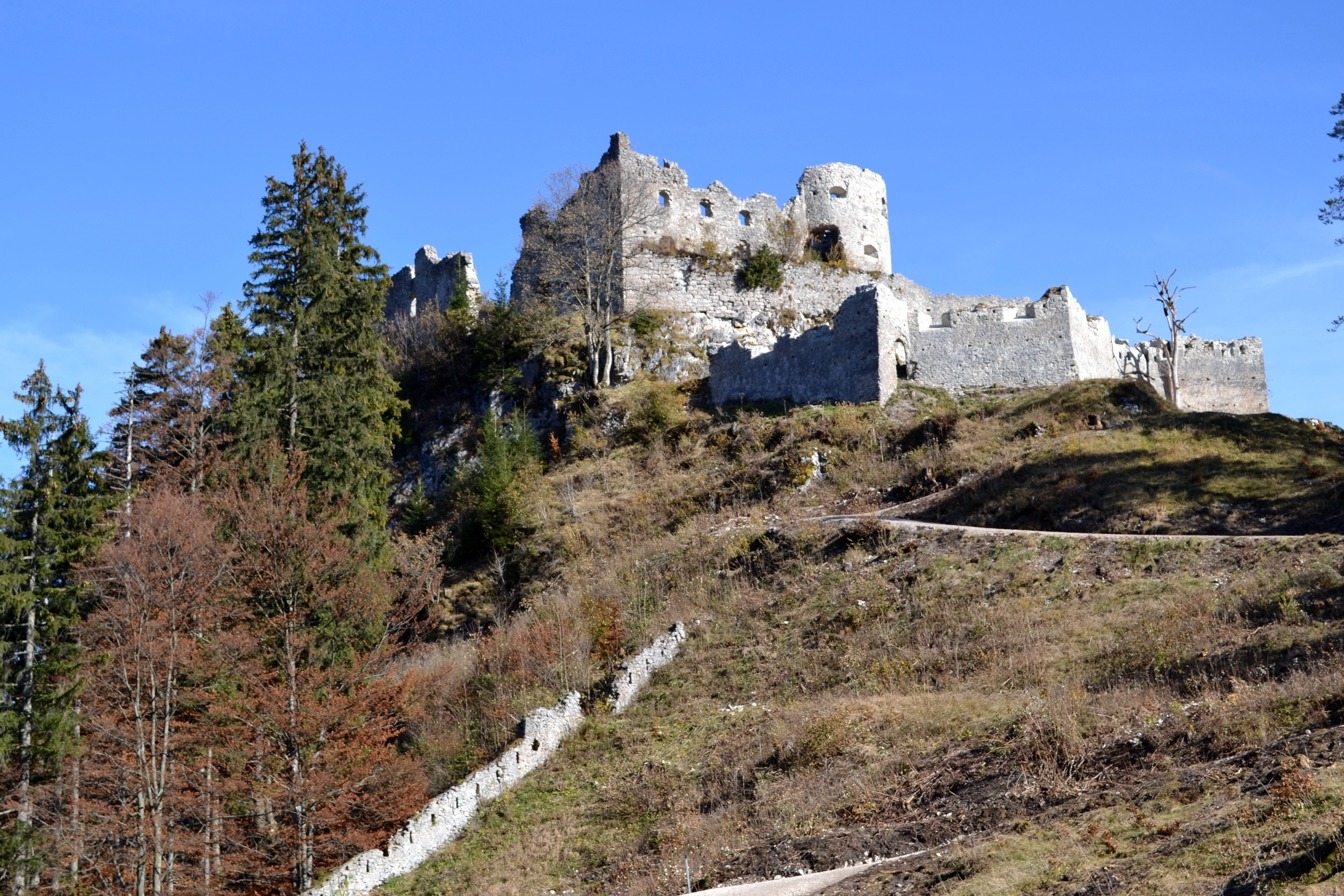
Ehrenberg Castle

Ehrenberg Castle is a castle located in Reutte in Tyrol, Austria.

== Highline179 ==
In 2014, the world's longest pedestrian suspension bridge was completed between the Ehrenberg Castle ruins and Fort Claudia, spanning the strategically important pass that these two structures were in part meant to guard. The length of the bridge is 1,322 feet (403 meters), with a height of 360 feet (110 meters).
