= Lake Kuttara =

Caldera lake on the island of Hokkaido, Japan

- 倶多楽湖 (Japanese)
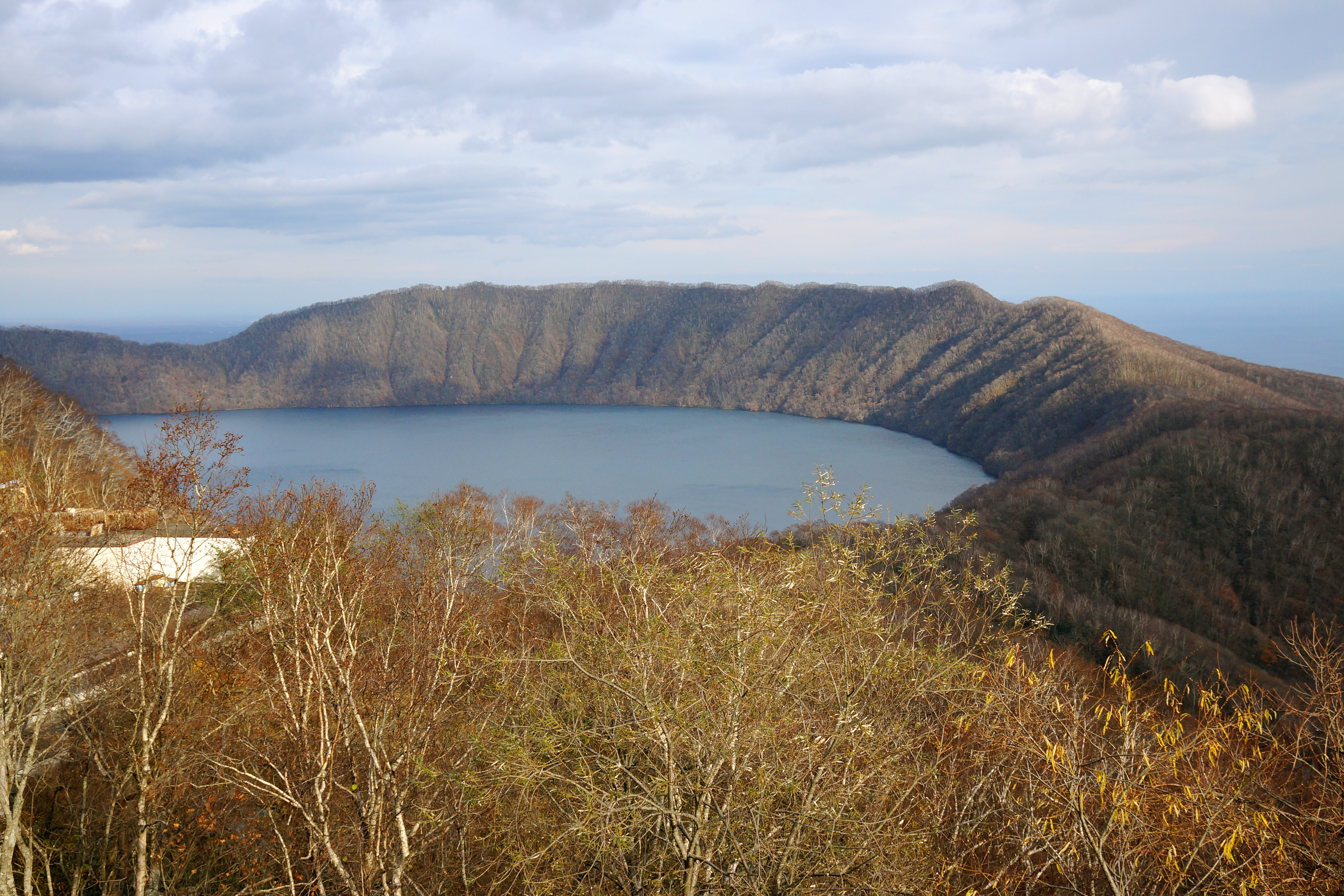
- View from the crater rim (November 2013)

- Location within Hokkaido
- Coordinates: 42°30′N 141°10′E
- Type: oligotrophic crater lake
- Primary inflows: none
- Primary outflows: evaporation
- Basin countries: Japan
- Surface area: 4.68 km^{2} (1.81 mi^{2})
- Max. depth: 148 m (486 ft)
- Shore length^{1}: 8 km (5.0 mi)
- Surface elevation: 258 m (846 ft)
- Islands: none
- Settlements: Shiraoi
- ^{1} Shore length is not a well-defined measure.

Lake Kuttara (倶多楽湖, Kuttara-ko) is a nearly circular caldera lake in Shiraoi, Hokkaidō, Japan. It is part of Shikotsu-Tōya National Park. The lake is recognized as having the best water quality in all of Japan. With a transparency of 19 metres (62 ft), the lake ranks second to Lake Mashū according to the Ministry of the Environment.

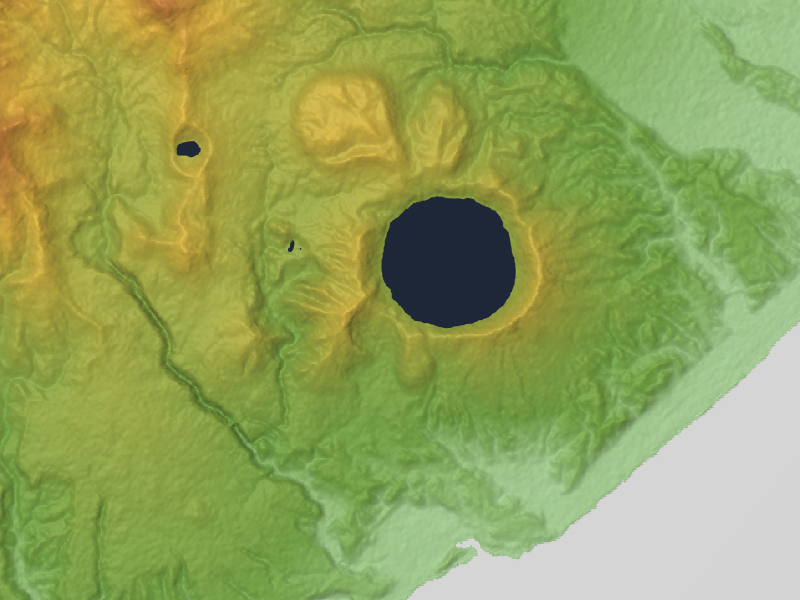
Relief Map

Resident species of the lake include a salamander species, Ezo salamander (エゾサンショウウオ, Ezo Sanshōuo). Since 1909, sockeye salmon have been introduced to the lake.

== See also ==
- List of volcanoes in Japan
- List of lakes in Japan
