= Plansee =

Lake in Reutte District, Tyrol, Austria

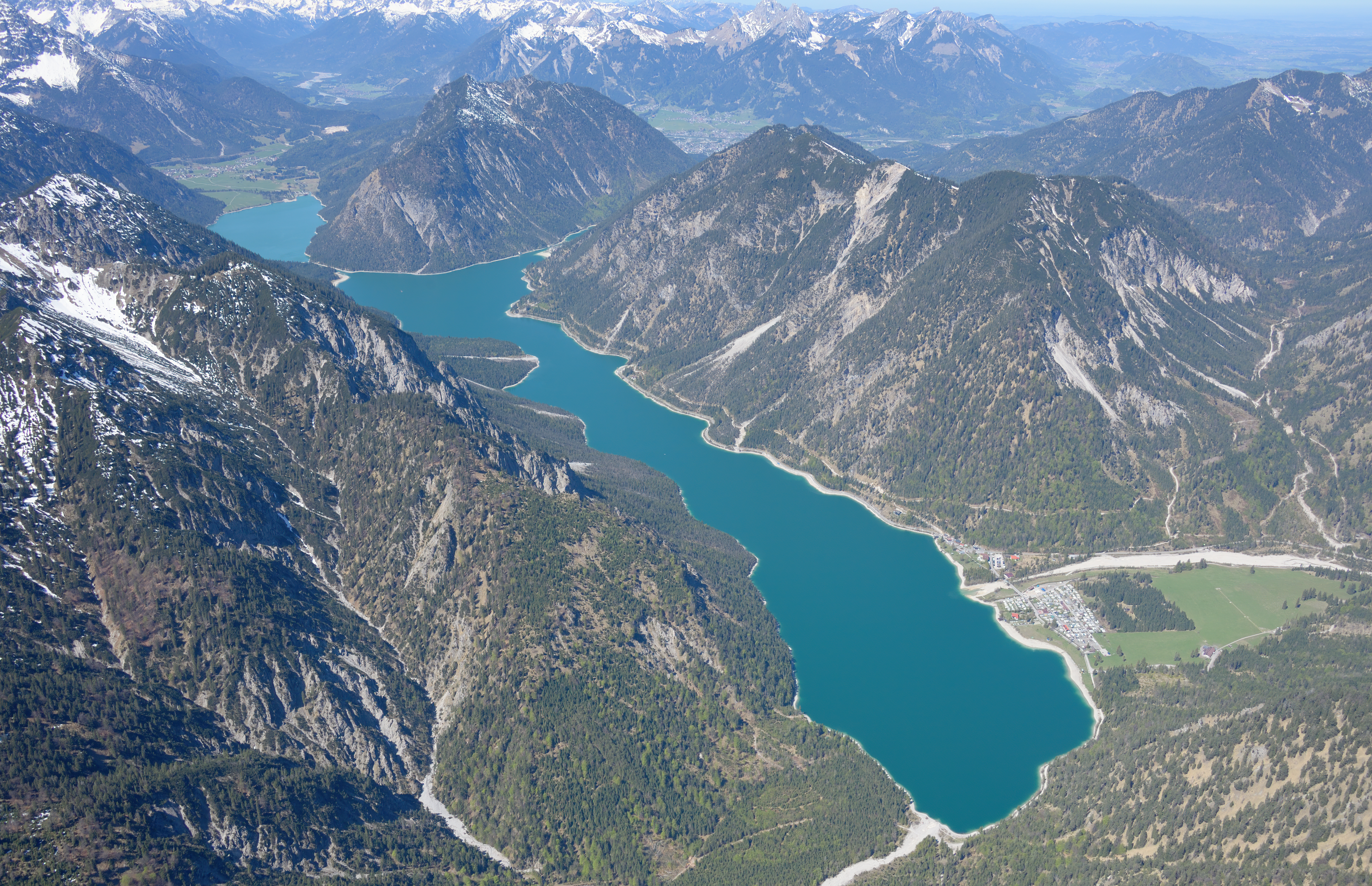

- Location within Austria
- Location: Tyrol
- Coordinates: 47°28′10″N 10°48′20″E
- Primary outflows: Archbach
- Basin countries: Austria
- Surface area: 2.87 km^{2} (1.11 sq mi)
- Max. depth: 78 m (256 ft)
- Settlements: Am Plansee

Plansee is a lake in Reutte District, Tyrol, Austria, located at 47°28′10″N 10°48′20″E. Its surface is approximately 2.87 km² and its maximum depth is 78 metres.

It lies on Austrian Federal Highway B 179, which crosses the Ammersattel into Germany.

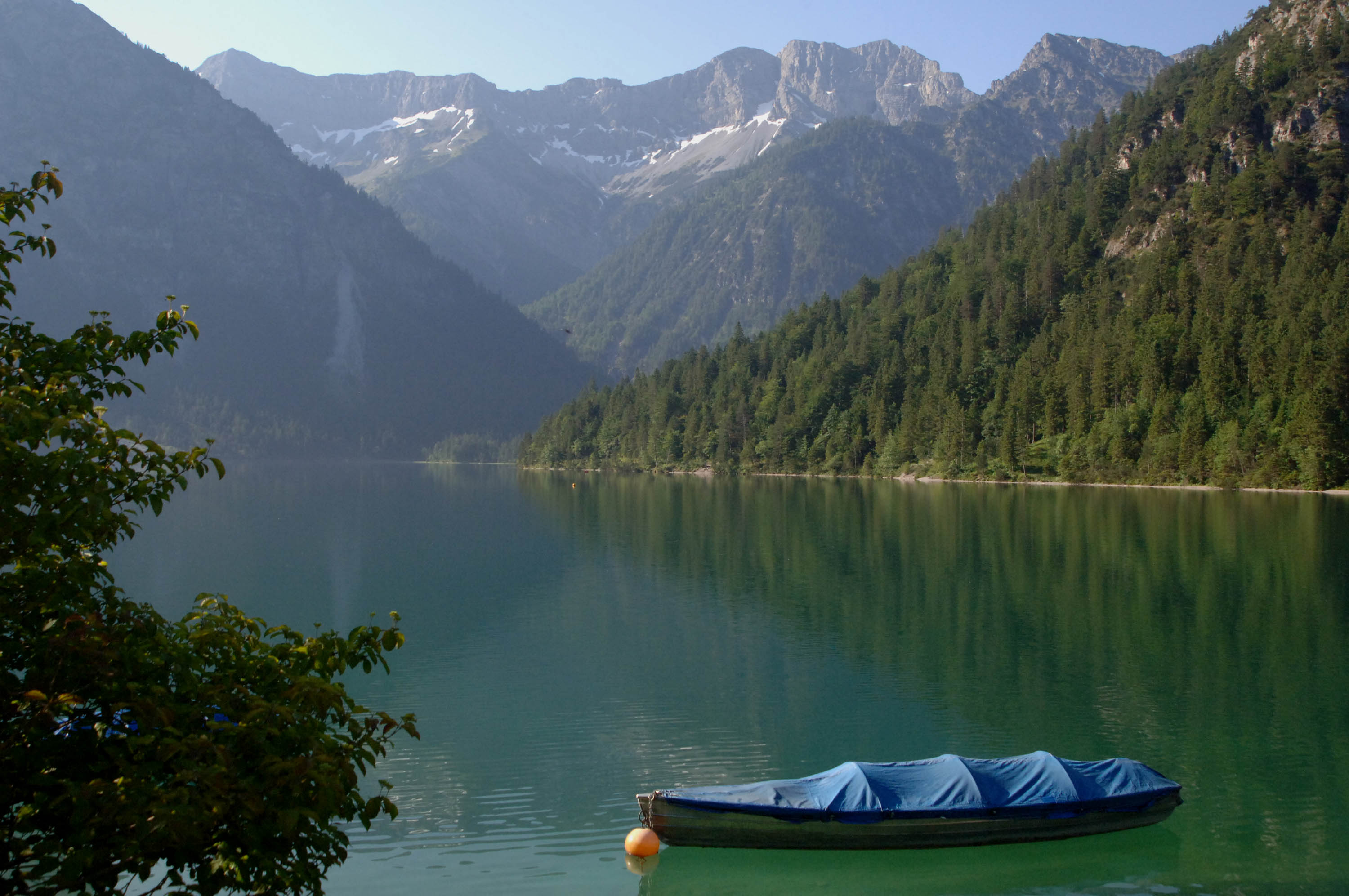
Boat on Plansee

== History ==
Plansee and Heiterwanger See are probably the remains of an Ice Age meltwater reservoir that once covered the entire Zwischentoren (de:Zwischentoren) area up to the Ehrwald Basin (de:Ehrwalder Becken).

The lake is first mentioned in a border description of the diocese of Freising from the years 1073/78 as Planse, other early names include; Please, Plense and Plase.

The Tyrolean princes and the Steingaden monastery held the fishing rights on the Plansee, as the Stams monastery in the 15th century through gift or acquisition. Duke Siegmund and his successor, Emperor Maximilian I, tried to get their hands on the best fishing waters in the country. Lake Achen from the Georgenberg monastery, and the Plansee from the Stams monastery. In Maximilian's fishing book from 1500, the Heiterwanger and Plansee are described as two particularly important lakes for the sovereign's hunting and fishing pleasures. However, the Stams monastery insisted on its rights and was granted a limited fishing right, which was confirmed in a contract of 1631 by Archduke Leopold V.

In 1902, the Plansee power plant was put into operation, and in 1908 the canal to the Heiterwanger See was built, and was eventually widened in 1951. Thanks to the greater generation of electricity brought about by Hermann Stern who succeeded in 1922 in persuading Paul Schwarzkopf to found the Plansee metal works.

During World War II, a subcamp of Dachau concentration camp for men and women was located here. Among others, the French politician Jean Ybarnégaray was sent there in 1943.
