= Reutte =

Town in Tyrol, western Austria

Reutte Raete (Swabian)
- Municipality
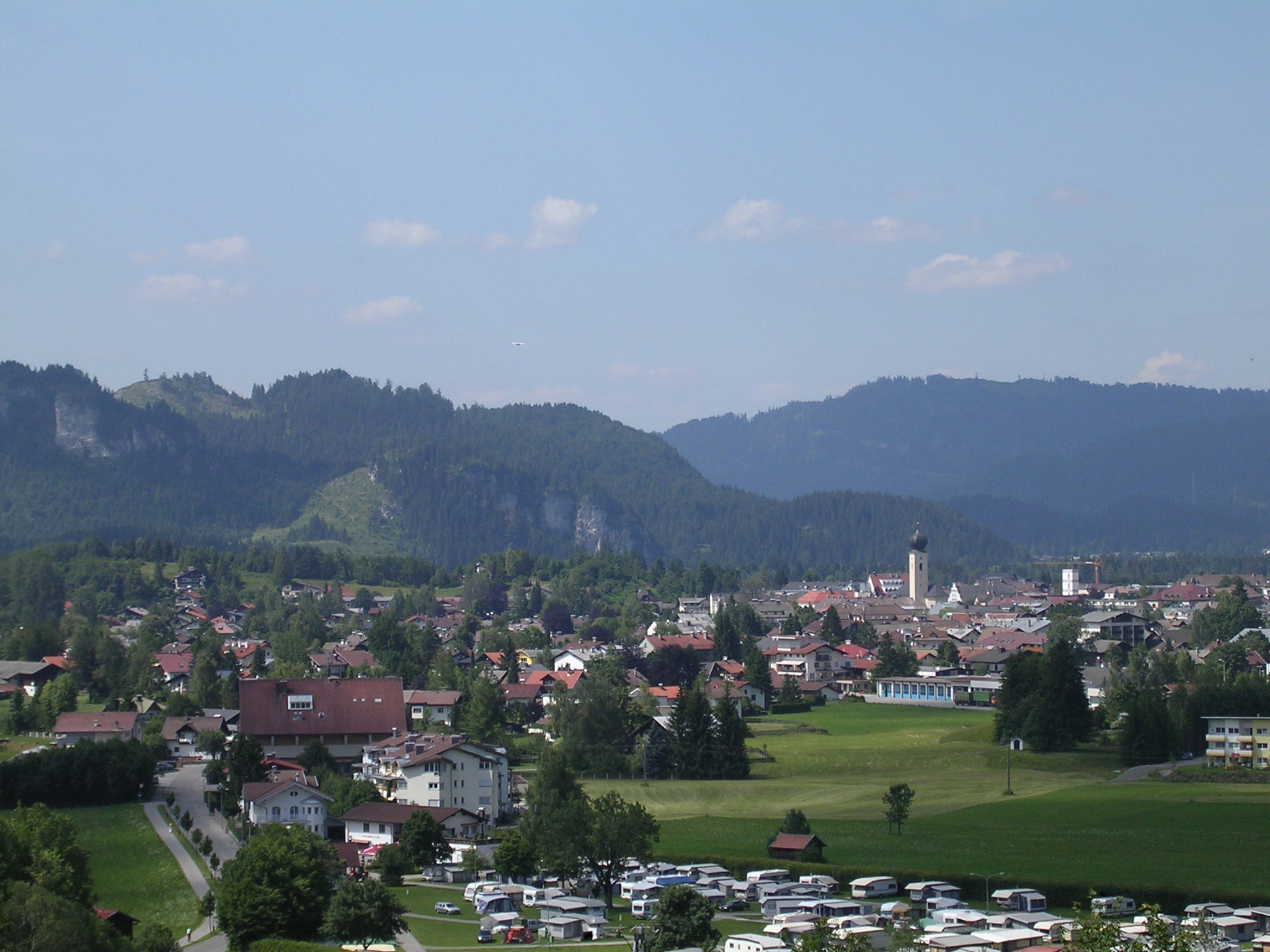

- Coat of arms

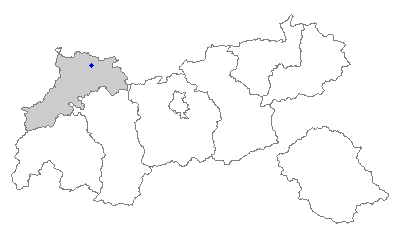
- Location in Tyrol

- Location within Austria Reutte (Tyrol, Austria)
- Coordinates: 47°29′00″N 10°43′00″E
- Country: Austria
- State: Tyrol
- District: Reutte

Government
  - Mayor: Günter Salchner (Wir lieben Reutte)

Area
  - Total: 100.92 km^{2} (38.97 sq mi)
- Elevation: 853 m (2,799 ft)

Population (2021)
  - Total: 6,989
  - Density: 69.25/km^{2} (179.4/sq mi)
- Time zone: UTC+1 (CET)
  - Summer (DST): UTC+2 (CEST)
- Postal code: 6600
- Area code: 05672
- Vehicle registration: RE
- Website: www.reutte.at

Reutte (German: [ˈʁɔʏtə]; Swabian: Raete) is a town in the Austrian state of Tyrol. It is the administrative center of the Reutte district (Districts of Austria). Reutte is located on the Lech, and has a population of 6,704 (as of 2018).

== Neighbouring municipalities ==
Adjacent municipalities and villages are: Breitenwang, Ehenbichl, Lechaschau, and Pflach.

== History ==
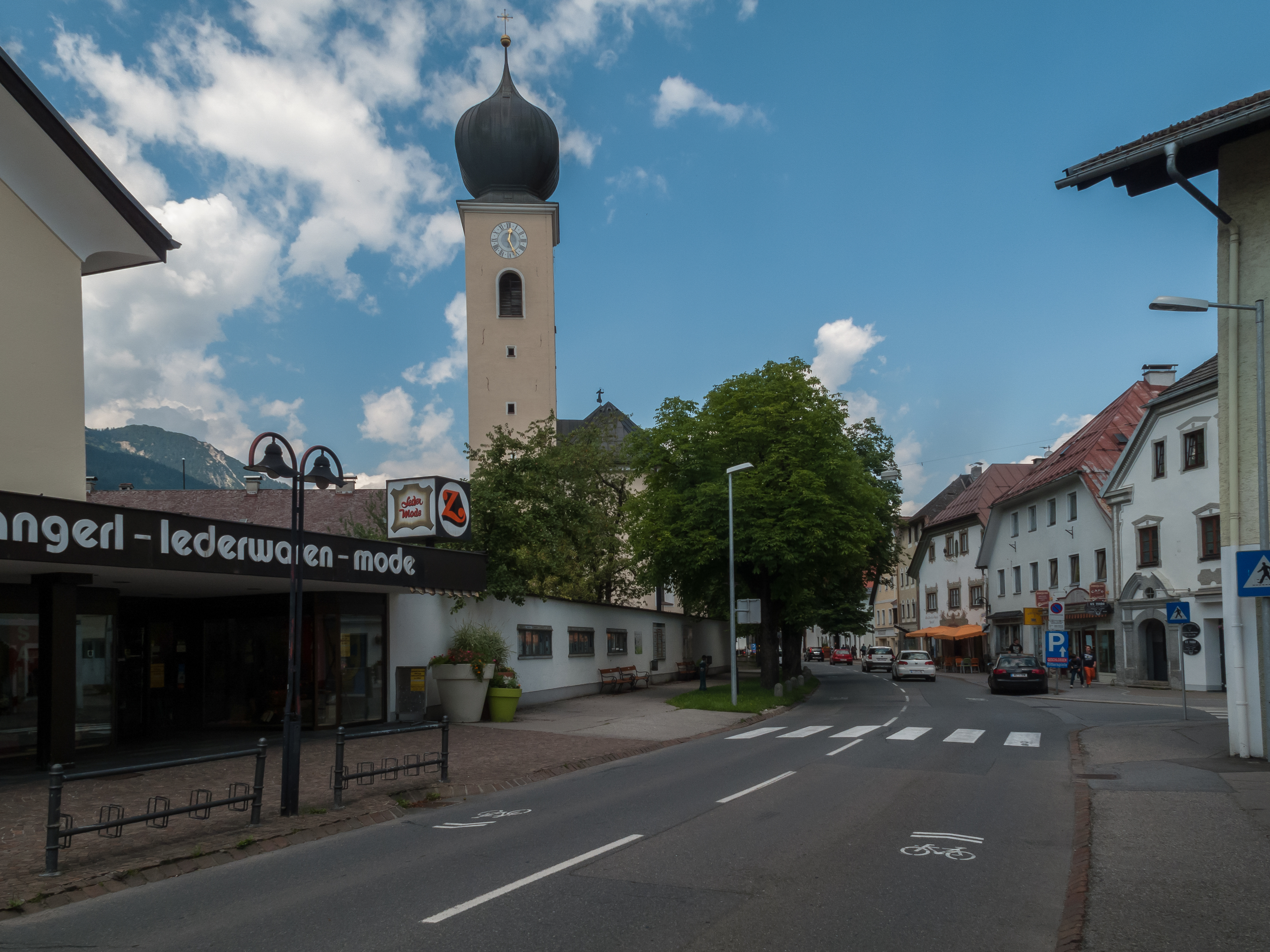
Church tower, Reutte Friary

Reutte is located on the Via Claudia Augusta, a Roman road leading from Germany to Italy. The Tyrolean Salt Road from Hall in Tirol to Lake Constance crossed the entire district of Außerfern.

Reutte (then Reuti) was declared a market town by Sigmund on June 5 1489. This was confirmed later by Maximilian I who also added some further rights. The people of Reutte commemorate this with an annual festival on the first Saturday in August.

From 1692 the painter Paul Zeiller had a workshop in Reutte that later became an art school. His son, Johann Jakob Zeiller and adopted son, Franz Anton Zeiller, both received their first lessons there.

On November 24, 1924, the lawyer Dr. Hermann Stern held a public meeting in Reutte with the aim of creating a district committee that would independently rule over the Reutte District. At the same time, Hermann Stern criticized the current District Governor Dr. Karl Peer and pointed out his mistakes, especially when it came to feeding people. In addition, the demands for a connection to Bavaria were loud and thus also the turning away from Tyrol, which was not well-disposed due to injustices in food rationing and a lack of transport links. Stern's comments during the gathering created discrepancies between Reutte and the surrounding communities. The reason for this was the different views of the current political picture of the upper circles in Reutte and the clergy in the communities belonging to the district. So instead of a district nutrition committee, Stern called for a district committee that would be elected and take charge of the entire administration of the district.

This demand was polarizing and was received with enthusiasm on one hand and hate speech on the other. The resolutions of the meeting were that they wanted to join Bavaria and that of Hermann Stern required district committee should be elected from 35 members. Until the election is carried out, an initially provisional district committee elected on the same day should be in charge of the administration. Hermann Stern became chairman of this provisional district committee. The motto of this district committee was: “It will be the task of the district committee to ensure that the right of self-determination and free self-government that the people have been granted after hard fighting and deprivation is actually exercised, not only in the state, but also in the district and in the church, is bestowed”.

As the process progressed, the final district committee was elected on December 16, 1918, in which three members of the Reutte community were represented. With a turnout of 75%, Dr. Hermann Stern was elected as one of the three community representatives.

During the period when Austria belonged to Germany (1938 – 1945) there was an outpost of Dachau concentration camp near Reutte, called “Plansee Breitenwald”. In April 1945, American troops of the 44th Infantry Division reached Reutte. The American soldiers had been told to expect heavy attacks but in fact there was no special resistance by Axis forces at all. Reutte was the place where German engineers from Peenemünde surrendered to the United States Army on 3 May 1945, among them Wernher von Braun; all of them were later sent to Fort Bliss in the United States in order to work on the manufacturing of ballistic missiles and rockets, the most famous of which was the Saturn V in the sixties.

As Reutte is connected with other major parts of the Tyrol only by the Fern Pass, international transport and economic connections to the EU, especially to Germany, are becoming increasingly important.

In 2003, a fragment of the Neuschwanstein meteorite was found near Reutte.

On May 4. 2024, Reutte was promoted to a town.

=== Coat of arms ===
The coat of arms of Reutte shows three fir trees on three hills, representing the abundance of available timber in the region. (The name "Reutte" has its origin in "roden" or "reuten" meaning glade). The background of red and white stripes stands for the state and the republic.

== Climate ==
Climate data for Reutte (1991–2020)
Month	Jan	Feb	Mar	Apr	May	Jun	Jul	Aug	Sep	Oct	Nov	Dec	Year
Record high °C (°F)	18.0 (64.4)	18.1 (64.6)	23.0 (73.4)	25.0 (77.0)	29.0 (84.2)	33.8 (92.8)	35.1 (95.2)	32.5 (90.5)	30.0 (86.0)	26.0 (78.8)	22.9 (73.2)	18.7 (65.7)	35.1 (95.2)
Mean daily maximum °C (°F)	3.3 (37.9)	5.2 (41.4)	8.4 (47.1)	13.0 (55.4)	16.4 (61.5)	20.2 (68.4)	21.3 (70.3)	21.1 (70.0)	17.6 (63.7)	13.3 (55.9)	8.1 (46.6)	3.7 (38.7)	12.6 (54.7)
Daily mean °C (°F)	−1.2 (29.8)	−0.1 (31.8)	3.6 (38.5)	7.5 (45.5)	11.6 (52.9)	15.0 (59.0)	16.8 (62.2)	16.6 (61.9)	12.6 (54.7)	8.8 (47.8)	3.6 (38.5)	−0.2 (31.6)	7.9 (46.2)
Mean daily minimum °C (°F)	−5.4 (22.3)	−5.4 (22.3)	−1.5 (29.3)	2.0 (35.6)	5.9 (42.6)	9.8 (49.6)	11.0 (51.8)	11.0 (51.8)	7.7 (45.9)	3.7 (38.7)	−0.8 (30.6)	−4.2 (24.4)	2.8 (37.1)
Record low °C (°F)	−25.4 (−13.7)	−20.8 (−5.4)	−23.0 (−9.4)	−9.0 (15.8)	−4.0 (24.8)	−2.0 (28.4)	2.0 (35.6)	1.6 (34.9)	−3.0 (26.6)	−8.5 (16.7)	−18.1 (−0.6)	−22.0 (−7.6)	−25.4 (−13.7)
Average precipitation mm (inches)	83.5 (3.29)	71.7 (2.82)	96.9 (3.81)	86.3 (3.40)	147.1 (5.79)	179.0 (7.05)	181.0 (7.13)	189.6 (7.46)	121.4 (4.78)	92.6 (3.65)	83.9 (3.30)	85.4 (3.36)	1,418.4 (55.84)
Average snowfall cm (inches)	60.6 (23.9)	59.6 (23.5)	43.9 (17.3)	16.6 (6.5)	1.2 (0.5)	0.0 (0.0)	0.0 (0.0)	0.0 (0.0)	0.0 (0.0)	4.8 (1.9)	33.5 (13.2)	54.8 (21.6)	275 (108.4)
Average precipitation days (≥ 1.0 mm)	10.8	10.2	12.2	11.6	14.6	15.9	16.1	15.0	12.3	10.5	10.6	11.7	151.5
Average snowy days (≥ 1.0 cm)	28.2	25.2	19.5	4.6	0.4	0.0	0.0	0.0	0.0	1.7	10.0	22.4	112
Average relative humidity (%) (at 14:00)	71.2	64.7	59.9	58.0	60.3	61.6	62.4	64.1	66.4	66.9	70.8	74.1	65.0
Mean monthly sunshine hours	105.5	107.0	140.7	153.8	191.3	170.0	186.0	186.5	163.3	139.3	92.8	81.2	1,717.4
Source: Central Institute for Meteorology and Geodynamics (sun 1971–2000)

== Population ==
Historical population
Year	Pop.	±%
1869	1,411	—
1880	1,470	+4.2%
1890	1,495	+1.7%
1900	1,576	+5.4%
1910	1,924	+22.1%
1923	1,966	+2.2%
1934	2,400	+22.1%
1939	2,476	+3.2%
1951	3,478	+40.5%
1961	4,285	+23.2%
1971	5,113	+19.3%
1981	5,132	+0.4%
1991	5,306	+3.4%
2001	5,719	+7.8%
2006	5,797	+1.4%
2011	5,912	+2.0%
2014	6,210	+5.0%
2018	6,708	+8.0%

== Tourism ==
Reutte is linked to Garmisch-Partenkirchen and Kempten, Allgäu by train services operated by Deutsche Bahn. Reutte is a popular holiday resort and its proximity to the famous Bavarian Castles and the Ehrenberg ruins make Reutte a cultural destination as well as a skiing destination.

== Twin city ==
- Esashi in Japan has been Reutte's twin town since 1991.
