= Franz Anton Zeiller =

Austrian painter

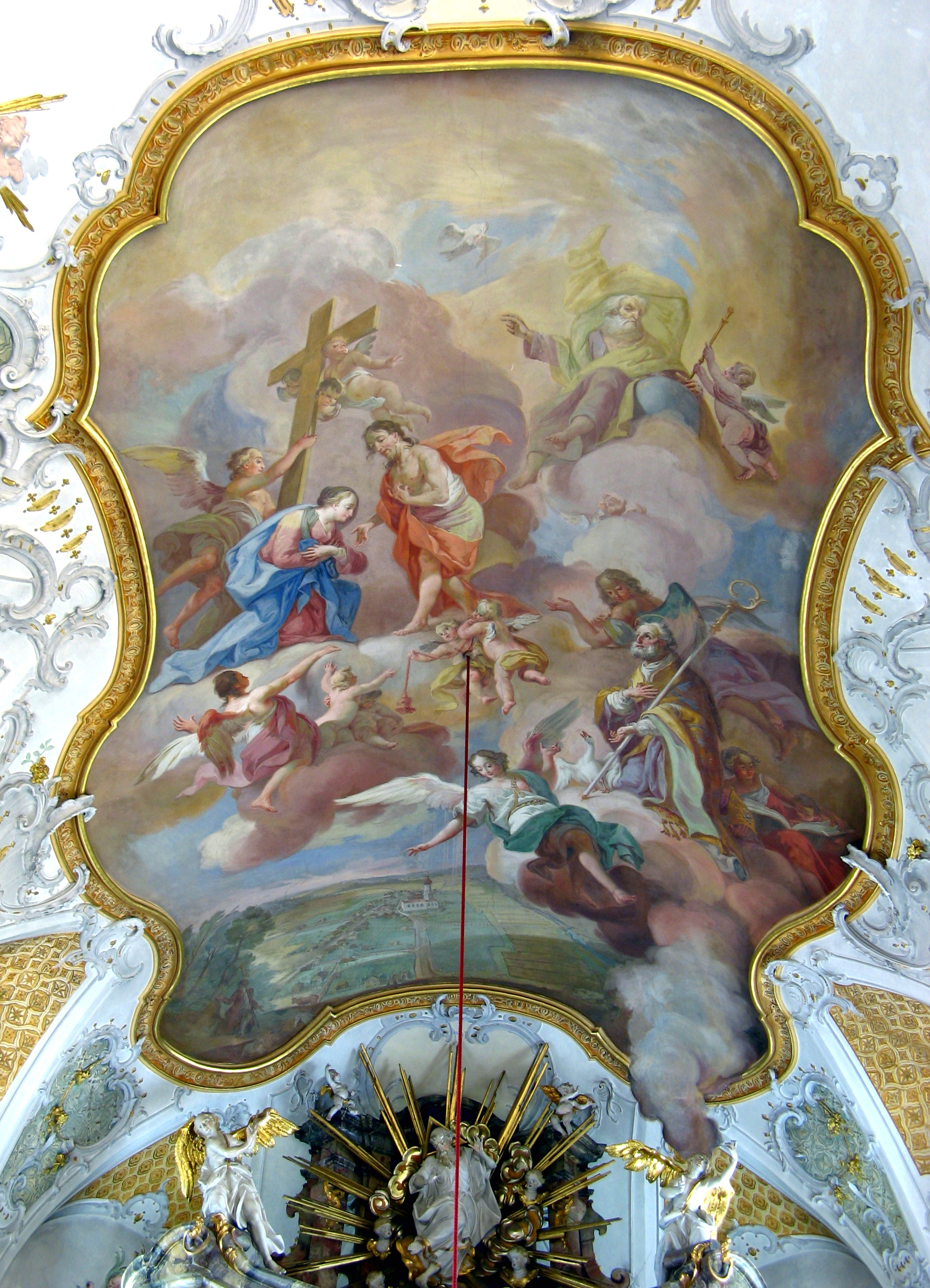
Choir fresco in Schlingen

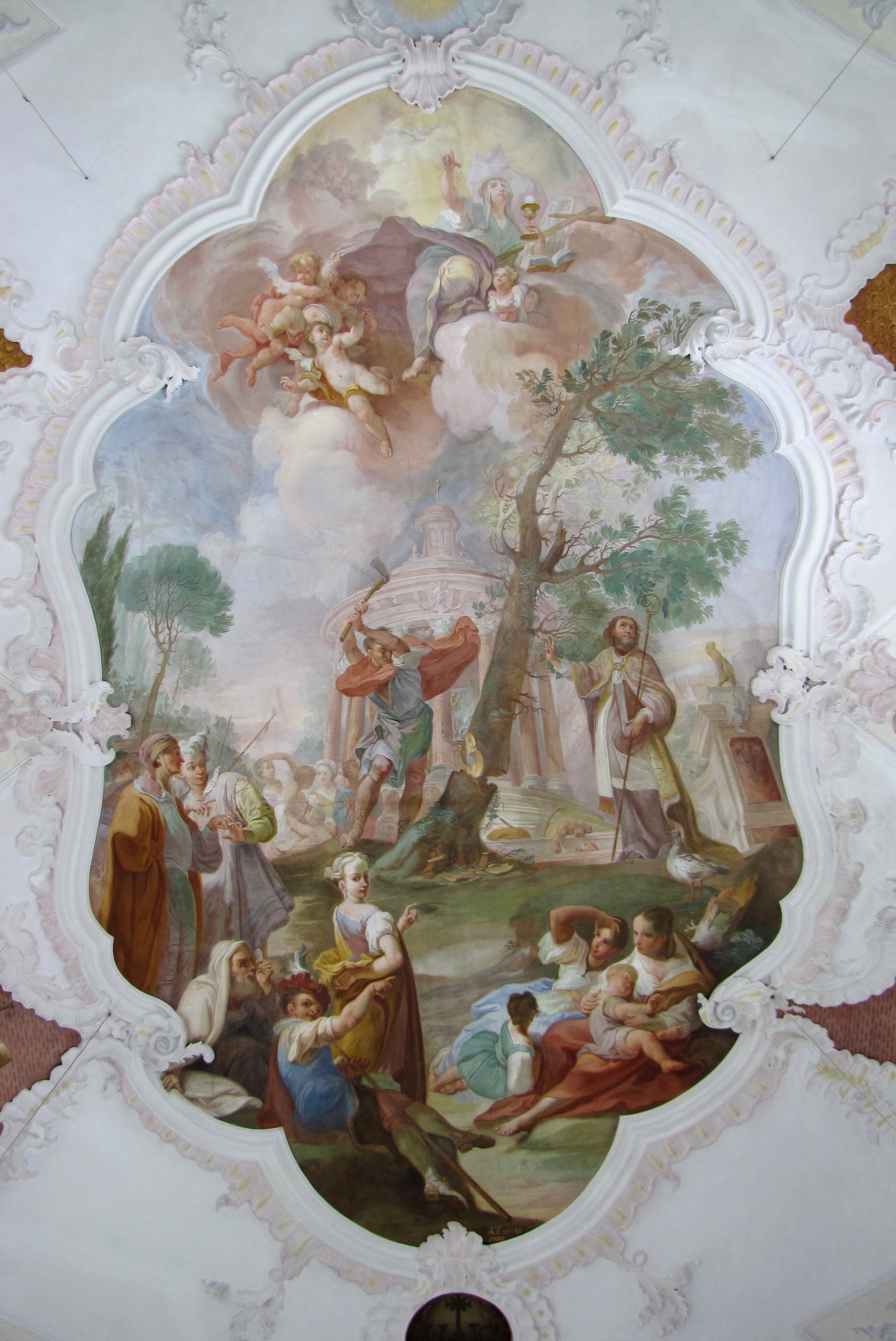
Ceiling fresco in Sachsenried

Franz Anton Zeiller (3 May 1716, Reutte - 4 March 1794, Reutte) was an Austrian painter, in the Rococo style.

== Biography ==
He lost his parents at a very early age. The painter, Paul Zeiller, who already had ten children of his own, adopted him into his family. He recognized Franz's talent almost immediately, and began giving him lessons. After 1728, Balthasar Riepp, who had married one of Zeiller's daughters, also began working in his studio and provided Franz with lessons in fresco painting. Franz remained there until Zeiller's death in 1738, then left Reutte.

His travels initially took him to Augsburg, where he came under the stylistic influence of Johann Evangelist Holzer; working as his assistant on a church painting project. Following Holzer's death in 1740, aged only thirty-one, he began working for Gottfried Bernhard Göz, who was also an engraver. He stayed with Göz for two years, then took some money he had saved and set off for Italy.

He was in Rome from 1742 to 1744 then, following a brief visit to Bologna, lived in Venice from 1744 to 1749. While in Rome, he worked with Corrado Giaquinto and copied some of the Old Masters. His personal notes of his time there have been preserved. He also copied works in Venice, and was especially impressed by Titian. After returning home, he again worked for Göz; assisting him with a ceiling fresco at the Wallfahrtskirche Birnau. Later, he became involved in creating a large cycle of paintings at Kaisheim Abbey.

His first personal commission came in 1752, from St. Mang's Abbey, Füssen, where the abbot, Gallus Zeiller, was a distant relative. After painting the chapel there, he was awarded a commission to execute frescoes and an altar painting at the parish church of St. Martin, in Schwabsoien, which was associated with the Abbey. He then worked with Johann Jakob Zeiller, Paul's son, at Ottobeuren Abbey. This was followed by a long series of projects, throughout Upper Bavaria and the Tyrol.

In 1768, the completion of some major works in Brixen led to his appointment as court painter there. He held that position until 1783, when Johann Jakob died, and he returned to Reutte to complete some of his commissions that had been left unfinished. When that was accomplished, he remained there with his adoptive family and continued to be active, creating small works, and one large fresco for the choir at a church in Grän. He died there in 1794, from an attack of "dropsy". He had never married and lived a modest life, thereby accumulating a considerable fortune.
