= Johann Jakob Zeiller =

Austrian painter

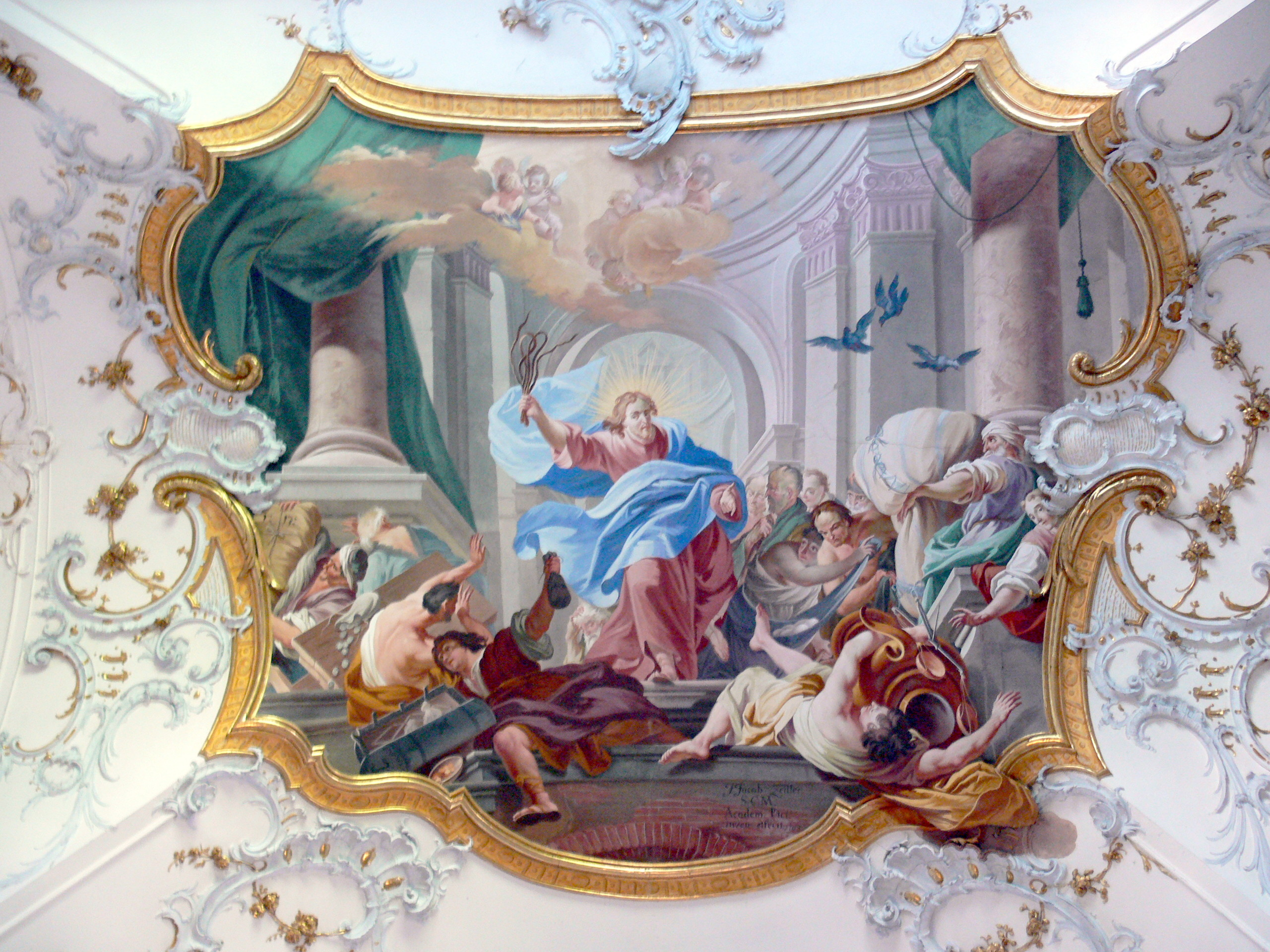
Johann Jakob Zeiller, Expulsion of the Moneychangers, fresco in entrance hall of the Ottobeuren Abbey, 1763

Johann Jakob Zeiller (8 July 1708 – 8 July 1783) was an Austrian painter.

Zeiller was born in Reutte, trained by his father Paul who was also a painter. In 1723 he began his apprenticeship with Sebastiano Conca in Rome, and then from 1729 to 1732 with Francesco Solimena in Naples. From there, Zeiller moved directly to Vienna, where he operated from 1733 until 1743 as an employee of Paul Troger. In 1737 he received the coveted title of an imperial court painter from the Academy of Fine Arts Vienna.

Zeiller painted primarily religious-themed frescoes. He did frescoes for the Aldersbach Abbey in Fürstenzell and the Ettal Abbey. He later returned to Reutte where he continued to work until his death in 1783. He contributed many frescoes in churches in Tyrol.

== Works ==
As an employee of Paul Troger

- 1733/1734: Ceiling frescoes in the Altenburg collegiate church
- 1734: Ceiling painting and lunette frescoes in the Sankt Pölten Abbey Library
- 1735: Painting of the pilgrimage chapel in Heiligenkreuz-Gutenbrunn
- 1735: The ballroom in the Seitenstetten Abbey is painted
- 1736/1738: Frescoes in the prelate rooms and in the ballroom of Altenburg Abbey
- 1737: Painting of the crypt chapel in Röhrenbach near Horn
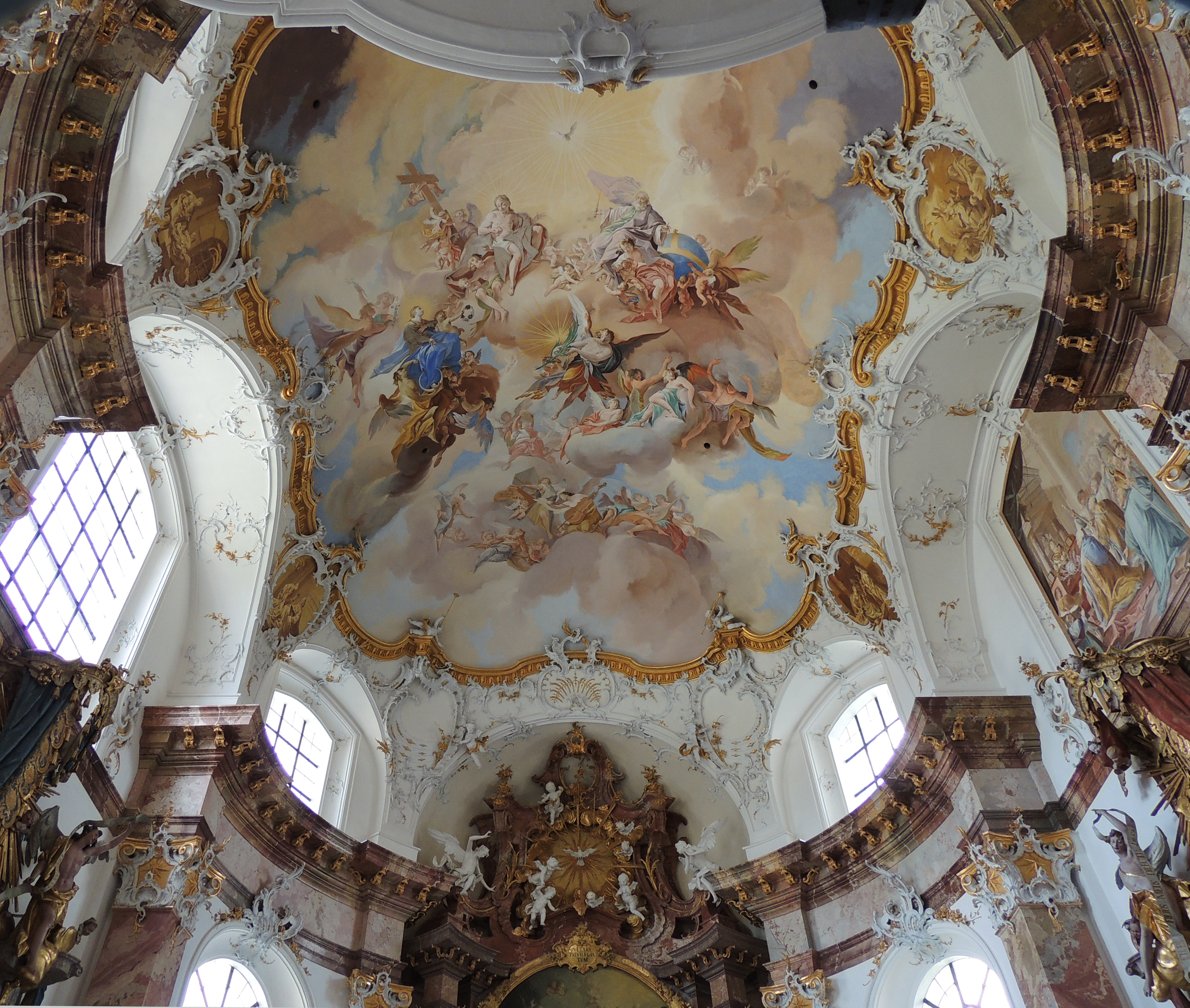
  Fresco in the Anastasia Chapel in Benediktbeuern Monastery
- 1738: Decoration of the staircase and the summer refectory in the Geras Abbey
- 1739: Painting of the "Salettl" in Melk Abbey
- 1740/1741: Ceiling fresco in the library of Seitenstetten Abbey
- 1742: Works in the Elisabethinen monastery church in Pressburg
- 1744: works in the Jesuit church of Győr (Hungary)

Independent work

- 1739: Dome fresco of the castle and parish church in Rosenau
- 1742/43: Frescoes with allegorical representations in the library vestibule and above the bookcases from Altenburg Abbey
- 1744/45: Ceiling frescoes, high altar and other side altar paintings in the church of the Fürstenzell monastery
- 1746: Ceiling paintings in the sacristy, abbot chapel and sacrament chapel of Aldersbach monastery
- 1747: Ceiling paintings in the refectory (destroyed) and in the sacristy of Ettal Abbey
- 1748–52: Dome fresco of the monastery church of Ettal Abbey
- 1752: Dome fresco of the Anastasia Chapel in Benediktbeuern Monastery
- 1752/53: Ceiling frescoes in the Curate Church of St. Georg in Bichl
- 1754/55: Ceiling frescoes in the choir and chapter room of the Ettal Benedictine abbey
- 1755: Ceiling fresco of the Gertrudiskapelle in Dickelschwaig near Ettal
- 1755: Ceiling frescoes in the parish church of St. Vitus in Iffeldorf
- c. 1755: Choir frescoes in the parish church of Breitenwang
- 1756: Altarpieces of the Antonius Altarpiece in the parish church of Oberammergau
- 1756–64: Dome and ceiling frescoes and altarpieces of the Basilica of St. Alexander and Theodor von Kloster Ottobeuren (partly with his relative Franz Anton Zeiller)
- 1759: Ceiling frescoes and altarpiece in the Michael's Chapel in Immenstaad on Lake Constance
- 1761: Ceiling and wall frescoes in the Psallier choir of the former Benedictine monastery church Fischingen / Switzerland
- 1761: Altarpiece of the sacrament altar (left next to the pulpit) in the monastery church of the Assumption in Ettal
- 1764: High altar picture of the church of Hinterhornbach
- 1765: Choir frescoes in the parish church of Eschenloheorg
- 1766: Ceiling frescoes in the stairwell, garden pavilion of the Cistercian Abbey of Fürstenzell
- 1767/68: Ceiling frescoes of the former canon monastery church of Suben
- 1771: Ceiling fresco in the dining room of Asbach Abbey
- c. 1772/74: Ceiling fresco in the former choir (today baptistery) of the church in Lechaschau
- 1773: Choir fresco in the parish church of Erkheim
- 1775/76: ceiling frescoes in the parish church of St. Nikolaus von Elbigenalp
- 1776: High altar picture in Stockach Church
- 1777: High altar picture in the parish church of Stanzach
- 1777: Side altarpiece of the parish church of Holzgau (now in the parish church of Gossensass)
- 1778: Ceiling frescoes in the nave of the parish church of Bichlbach
- 1779/80: Ceiling frescoes of the Johanniskirche in Feldkirch (destroyed)

== Sources ==
- Constantin von Wurzbach: Zeiler, Johann Jakob. In: Biographical Dictionary of the Empire, Austria. 59th band Publisher L. C. Zamarski, Vienna 1890, pp. 279 et seq.
- Hans Semper Zeiller, Jacob. In: General German Biography (ADB). 45th band Oxford University Press, Leipzig 1900, pp. 652–660.
- Harriet Brinkmöller-Gandlau: Zeiller, Johann Jakob. In: Biographic-bibliographic church encyclopedia (BBKL). Volume 14, Bautz, Herzberg 1998, ISBN 3-88309-073-5, pp. 372–374.
- Bauer Franz & Planckensteiner I : catalogue Franz Anton Zeiller, Reutte 1994
