= Jacob Carl Stauder =

Swiss-German painter

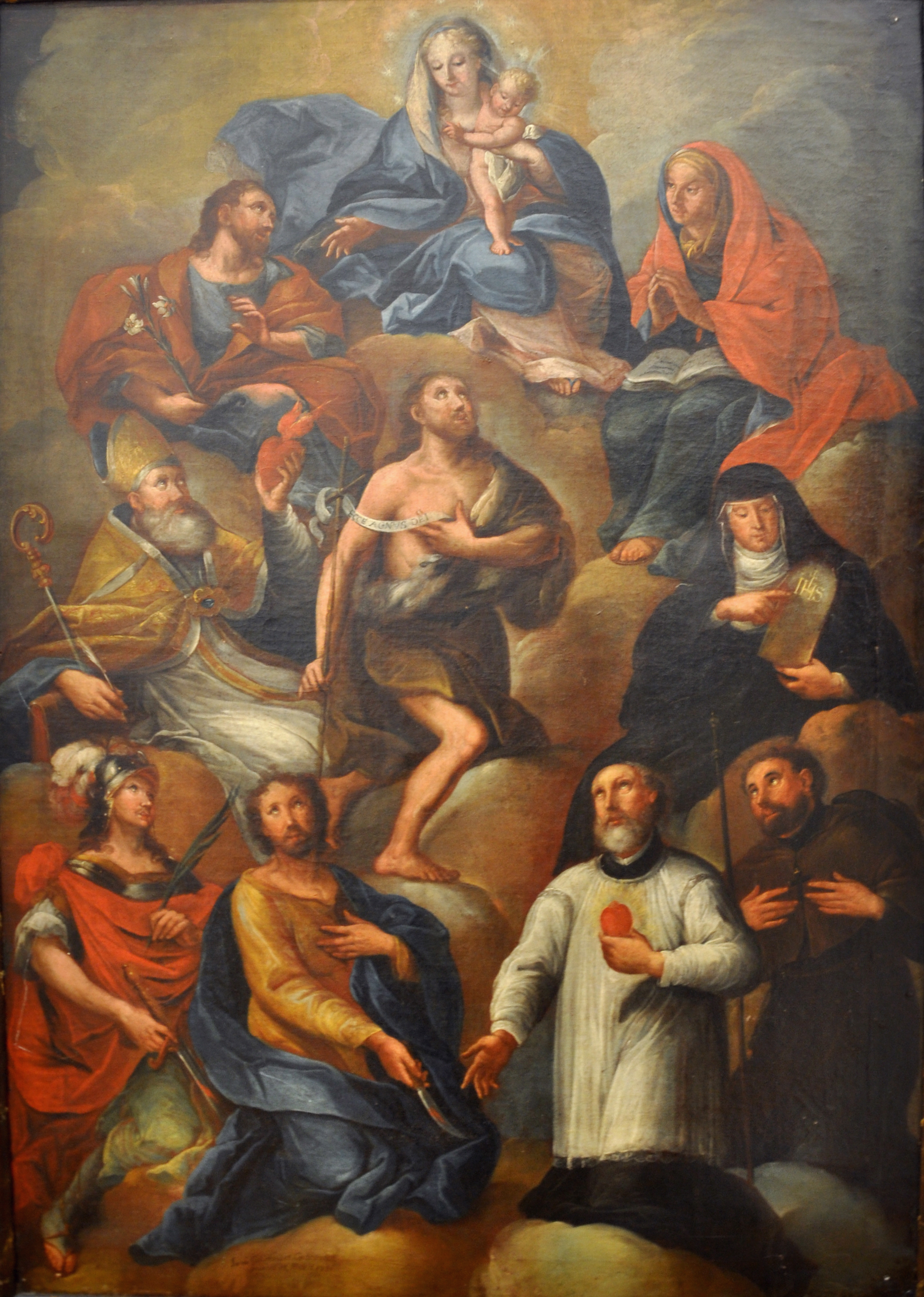
Our Lady, with nine saints

Jacob Carl Stauder (October 1694, Oberwil - 9 February 1756, Lucerne) was a Swiss-German painter in the Baroque style.

== Life and work ==
His father, Franz Carl Stauder (c. 1660-1714), was also a painter and gave him his first lessons. One of his first commissions came in 1710, from Rheinau Abbey, for a "roll of arms". Although he was from Baselland, he mostly worked in the area around Lake Constance, and in Upper Swabia.

After marrying Maria Francisca Bettle in 1716, he settled in Konstanz. where he became a citizen and, in 1724, a council member. He was also appointed by Johann Franz Schenk von Stauffenberg, the Prince-Bishop, to be the Episcopal Court Painter, succeeding Johann Michael Feuchtmayer, who had died in 1713. At some point, he began travelling frequently, to execute commissions, and came to prefer being away from Konstanz, leaving his wife and nine children alone most of the time.

In 1740, due to the presence of a major competitor in Konstanz (Franz Joseph Spiegler), he effectively became a resident of Saint Blaise Abbey. All of his works there were destroyed by a fire in 1788.

Most of his commissions came from monasteries. His work is very extensive, but much is unknown. Only two of his students have been identified: Johannes Zick and Jakob Anton von Lenz (1701-1764), although Balthasar Riepp also worked with him, possibly as an apprentice. He preferred a technique known as "a secco", in which the paint is applied to a dried plaster surface, rather than a wet one, as in the more common fresco technique.

== Sources ==
- Thomas Onken: Der Konstanzer Barockmaler Jacob Carl Stauder, 1694–1756: Ein Beitrag zur Geschichte der süddeutschen Barockmalerei, Thorbecke, Sigmaringen 1972, ISBN 3-7995-5017-8
- "Stauder, Jakob Karl". SIKART Lexicon on art in Switzerland.
- Stauder, Jacob Carl in German, French and Italian in the online Historical Dictionary of Switzerland.
