= Franz Georg Hermann =

German painter

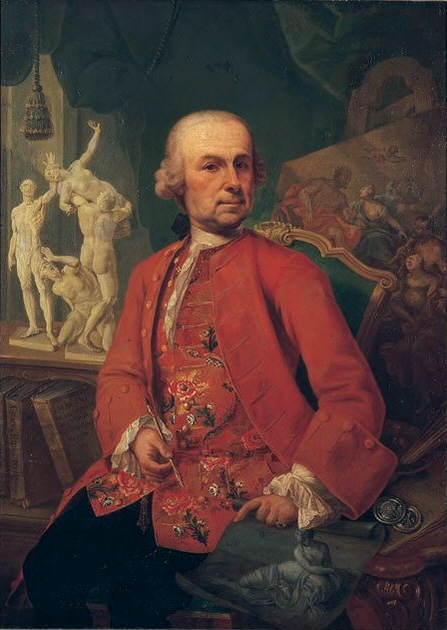
- Self-portrait (1767)
- Born: 29 December 1692; Kempten
- Died: 25 November 1786 (aged 93); Kempten
- Occupation: Painter

Franz Georg Hermann (29 December 1692, Kempten - 25 November 1768, Kempten) was a German painter in the Baroque style.

== Life and work ==
His first studies were with his father, the court painter, Franz Benedikt Hermann. Then, at the age of fifteen, the Benedictines awarded him 900 Guilders to study in Rome, where he attended at the Accademia di San Luca under Sebastiano Conca and, from 1713–14, lived in a room attached to the workshop of the sculptor Pierre Le Gros the Younger. He took further training in Venice with Giovanni Antonio Pellegrini and returned to Germany in 1718. Initially, he worked at Ottobeuren Abbey or in Füssen at St. Mang's Abbey, where he created ceilings and altarpieces. In 1725, he was appointed court painter by Anselm Reichlin von Meldegg, the Prince-abbot.

Later, he worked in Immenstadt and Ettal. At St. Lorenz Basilica in Kempten, he painted the St. Nikolaus Dome and Benedict's Chapel in 1736 and returned in 1748 to create five oval altarpieces.

In the State Rooms of the Fürstäbtliche Residenz (a monastery complex), he painted the ceilings and walls as well as portraits of former Prince-abbots in the Residence Hall. He spent the years 1740 to 1742 painting the banquet hall at the "Ponikauhaus", an official residence for the Prince-abbot. In 1757, he produced his most extensive works for the library at Schussenried Abbey.

Overall, very few major religious structures within a twenty-mile or 30 km radius of Kempten are without frescoes, altarpieces or other works by Hermann.

== Frescoes from the Schussenried Abbey library ==
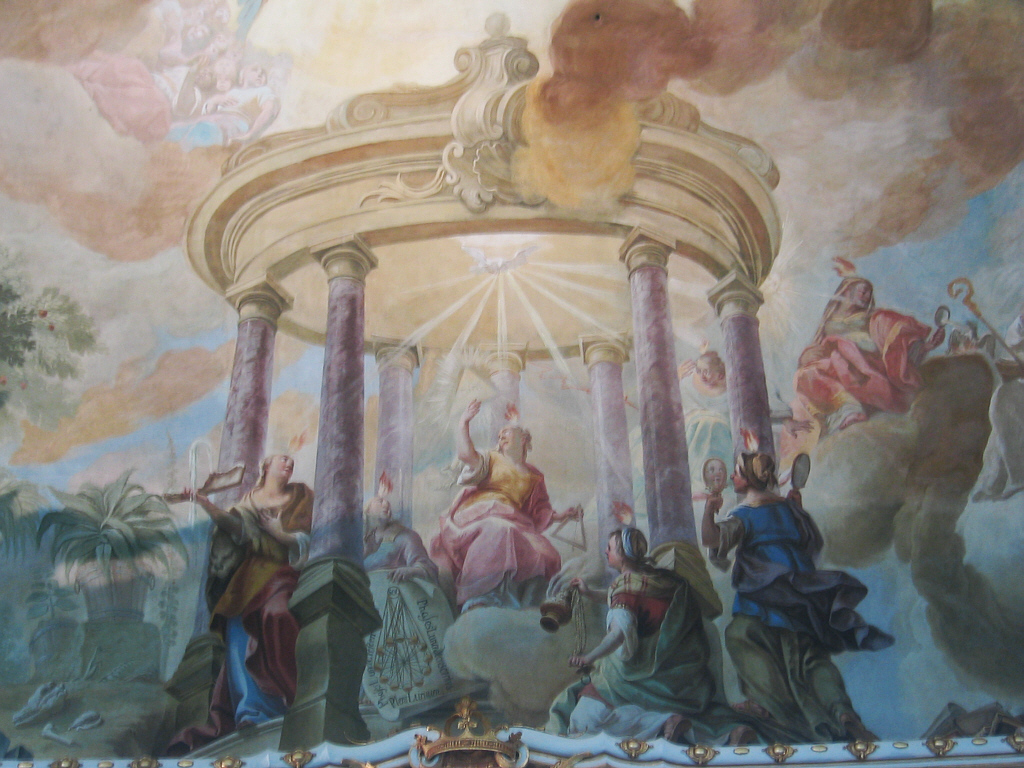
Temple of the Holy Spirit with the Seven Gifts of Grace

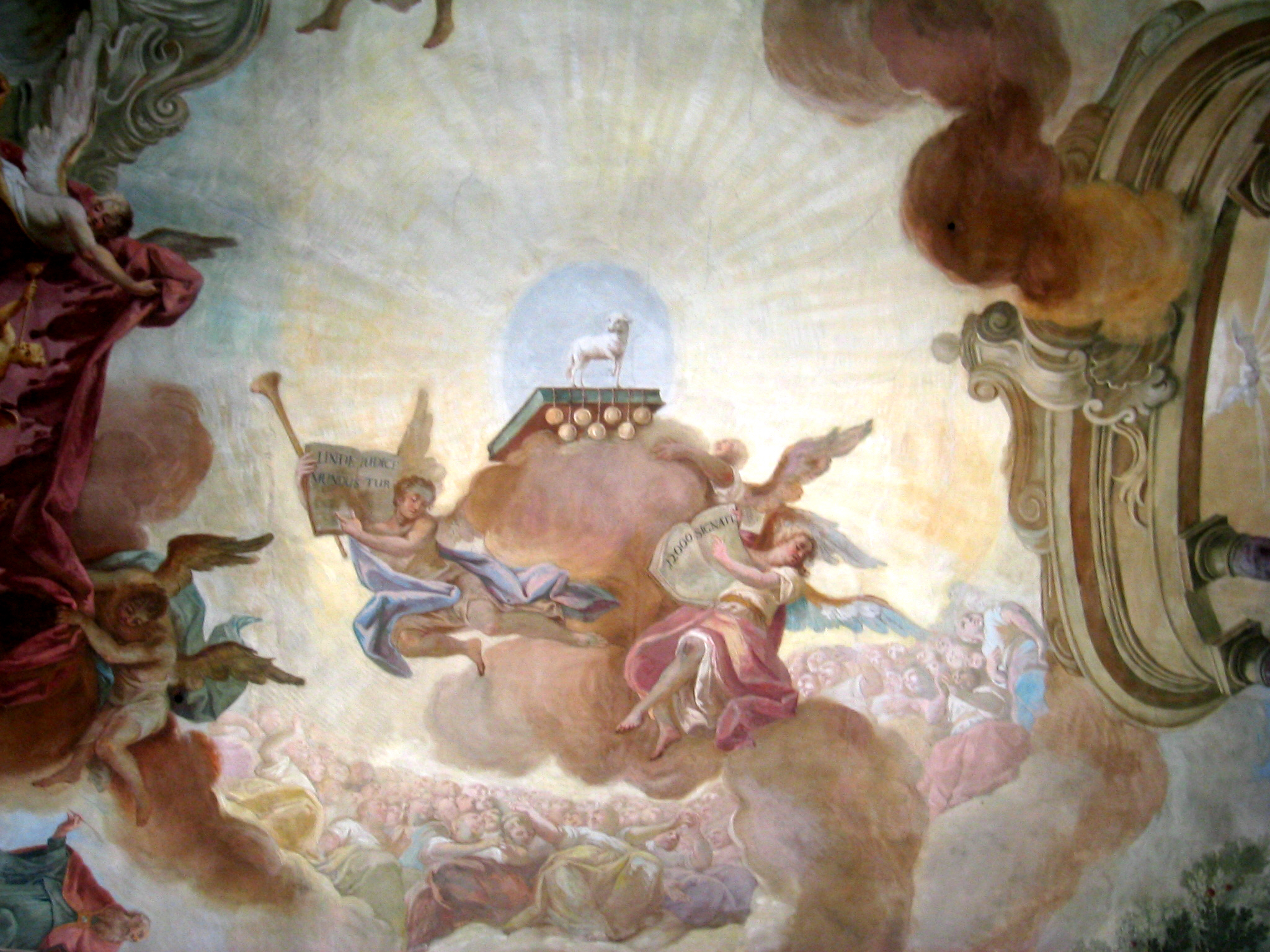
Day of Judgment with the Apocalyptic Lamb

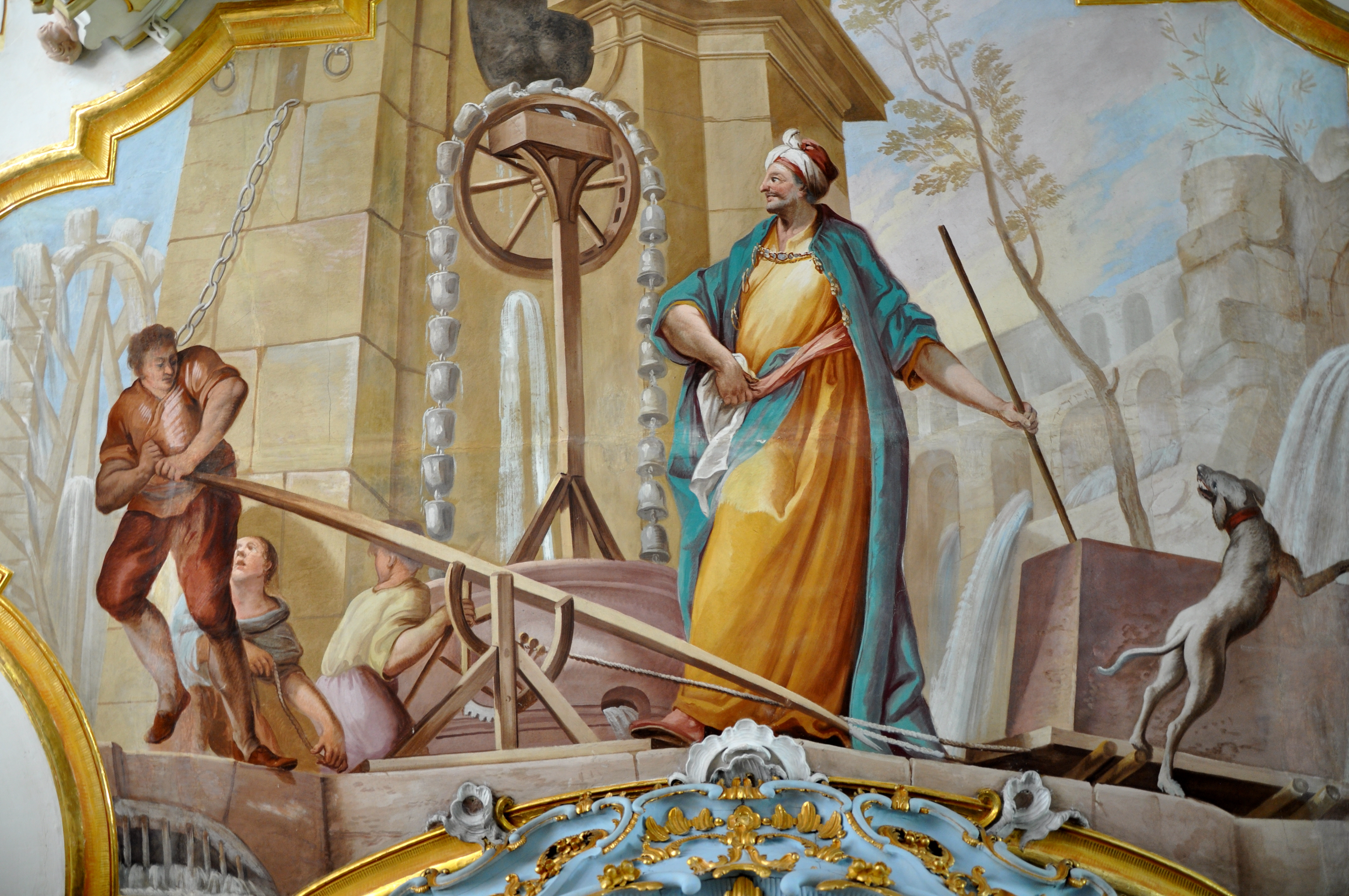
The Four Elements (Water)

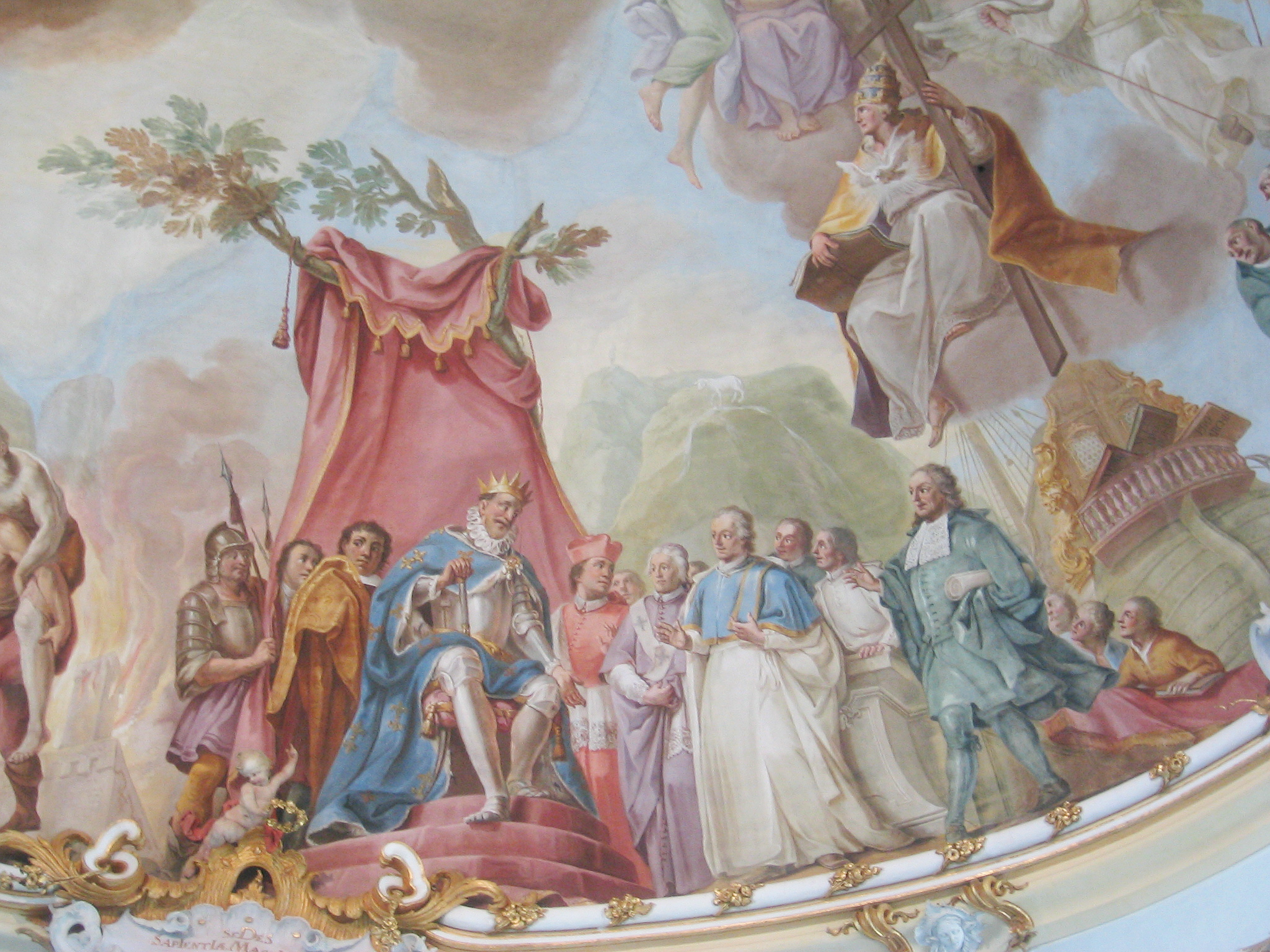
Group of Wise Men, with Louis XIV and Pope Gregory the Great
