= Paul Zeiller =

Austrian painter (1658–1738)

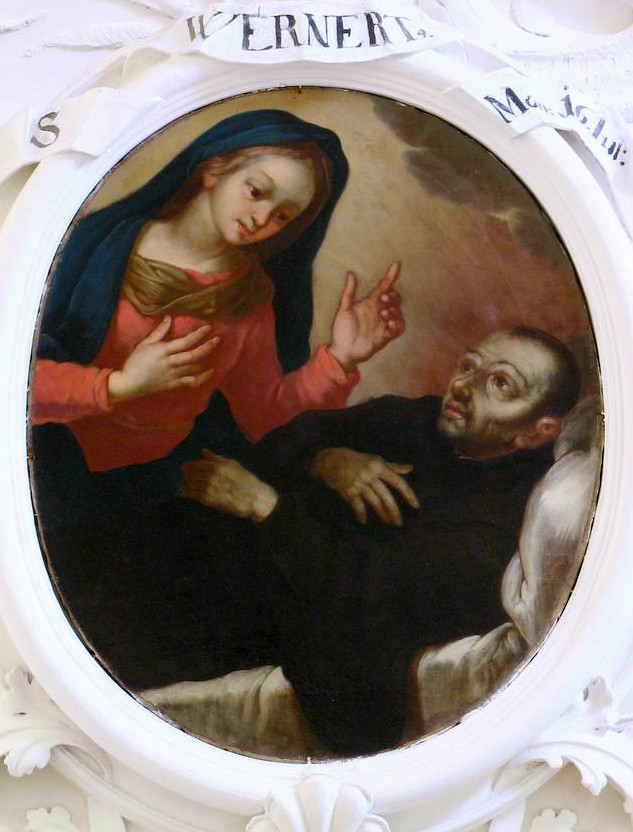
Portrait of a Benedictine, Chapter Hall, St.Mang's Abbey

Paul Zeiller (21 August 1658 in Reutte – 19 August 1738 in Reutte) was an Austrian painter in the Baroque style. From 1692, he had a workshop in Reutte that later became an art school. His son, Johann Jakob Zeiller and adopted son, Franz Anton Zeiller, both received their first lessons there.

== Life and career ==
After his primary education, it was his original intent to become a clergyman. However, around 1675, he seems to have rejected this plan, travelling to Florence, where he became a tutor at the Medici court. He soon made the acquaintance of Livio Mehus, the court painter, who first aroused his interest in art. After some successful early efforts, he resigned from the court to devote himself entirely to painting, continuing to work with Mehus for several years. Some sources maintain that he lived in Rome for sixteen years, but he may have received training in Augsburg in 1682, possibly with Johann Georg Knappich (1637–1704).

Later, he did decide to settle permanently in Rome, but returned to Reutte in 1692 to visit his mother, who was terminally ill. During his stay, he met Regina Jäger, whom he married a week after his mother's death in May. By September, he had decided to remain in Reutte. Regina died in 1698, shortly after the birth of their third child, and he quickly remarried. In 1699, his new wife Anna gave birth to a daughter who would become the wife of painter Balthasar Riepp.

It has been reported that he was named a court painter for the Habsburgs, through the intercession of a brother who held a high official position in Vienna, but this cannot be confirmed. What is definitely known is that he became the Mayor or Reutte in 1710 and performed his duties conscientiously.

== Work ==
He devoted himself almost entirely to panel painting, and his only known ceiling fresco (at the Church of the Resurrection in Breitenwang) is executed in panels. Later, he established a well-attended panel painting school at his workshop. After his death, it was continued by his son-in-law, Riepp.

Although he was quite prolific, all of his works done before 1695 have been lost and only a few are still in their original locations. His only surviving oil paintings are in the Chapter Hall at St. Mang's Abbey, Füssen.

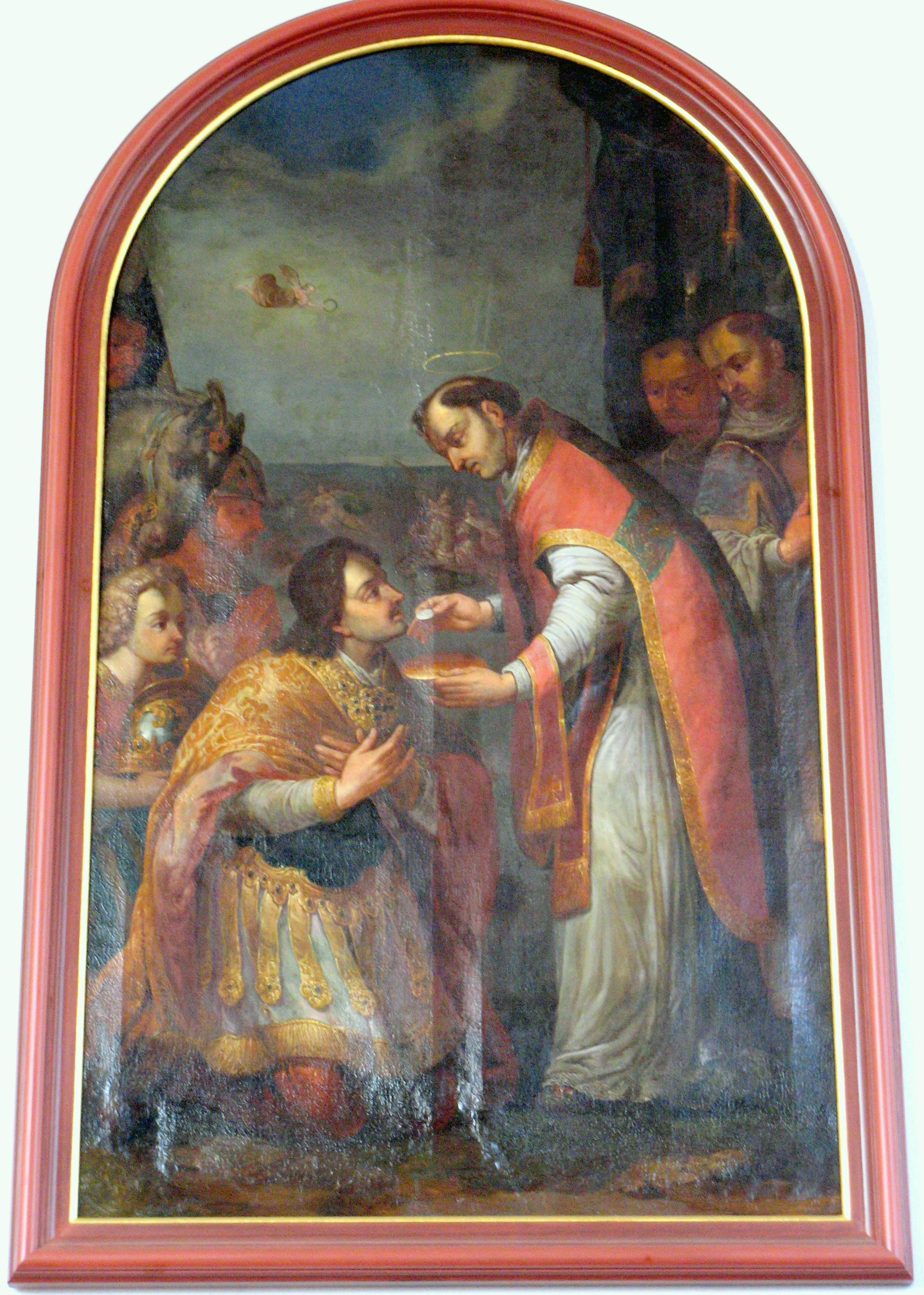
Saint Ulrich gives Communion to King Otto, at the church in Aitrang

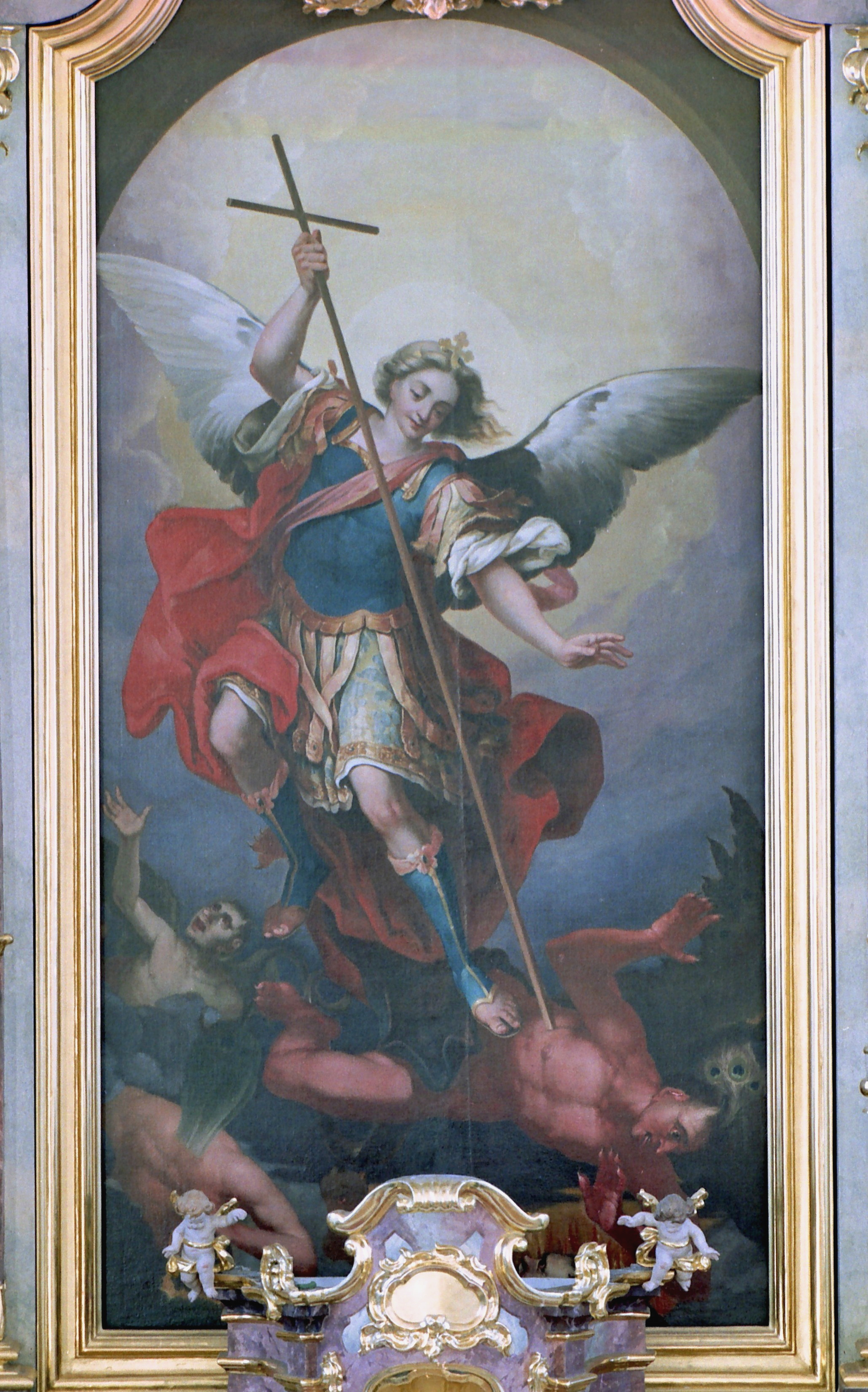
Altarpiece, at the church of Bayerniederhofen (Halblech)

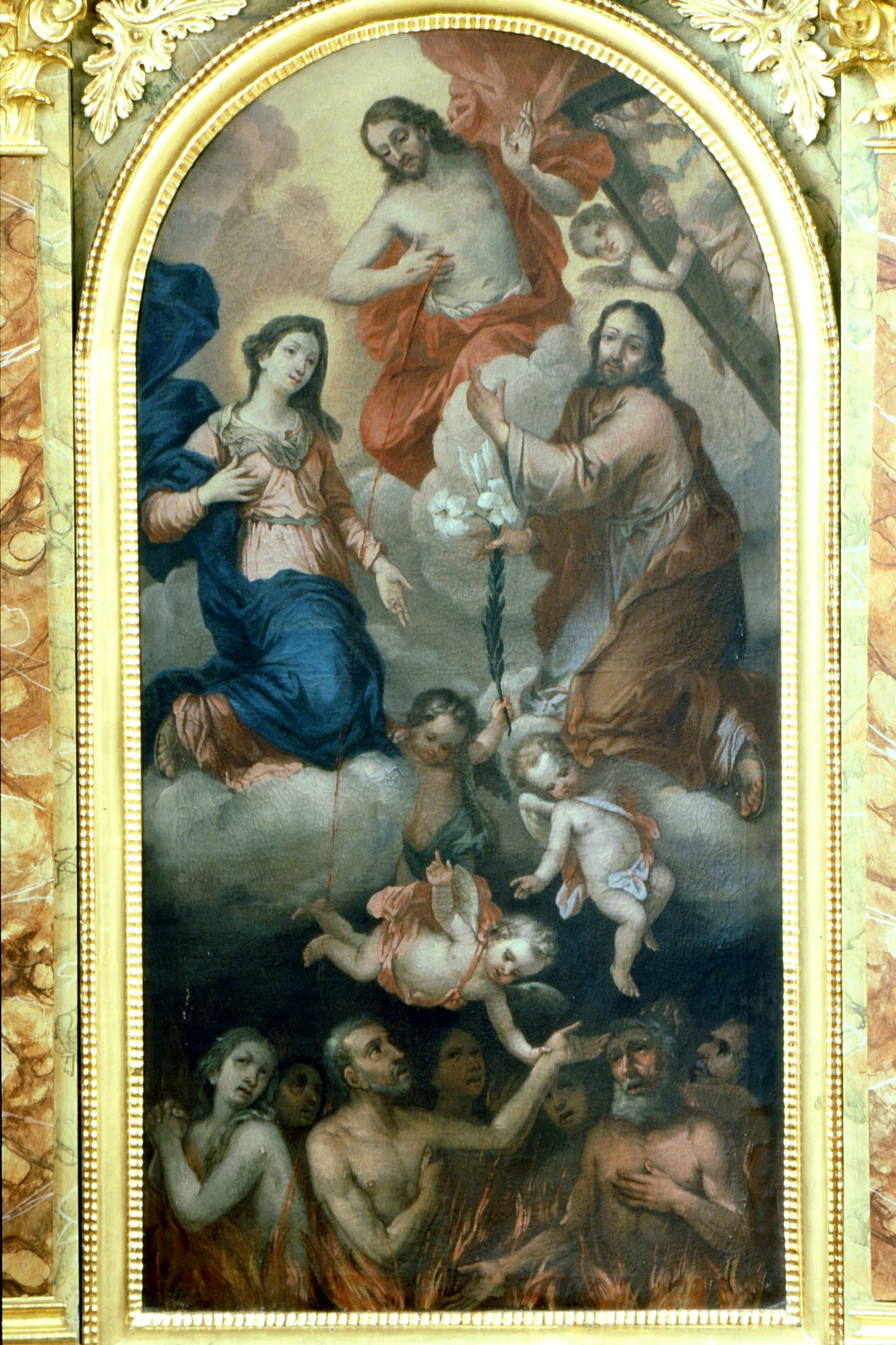
Altarpiece at the Parish Church in Vils

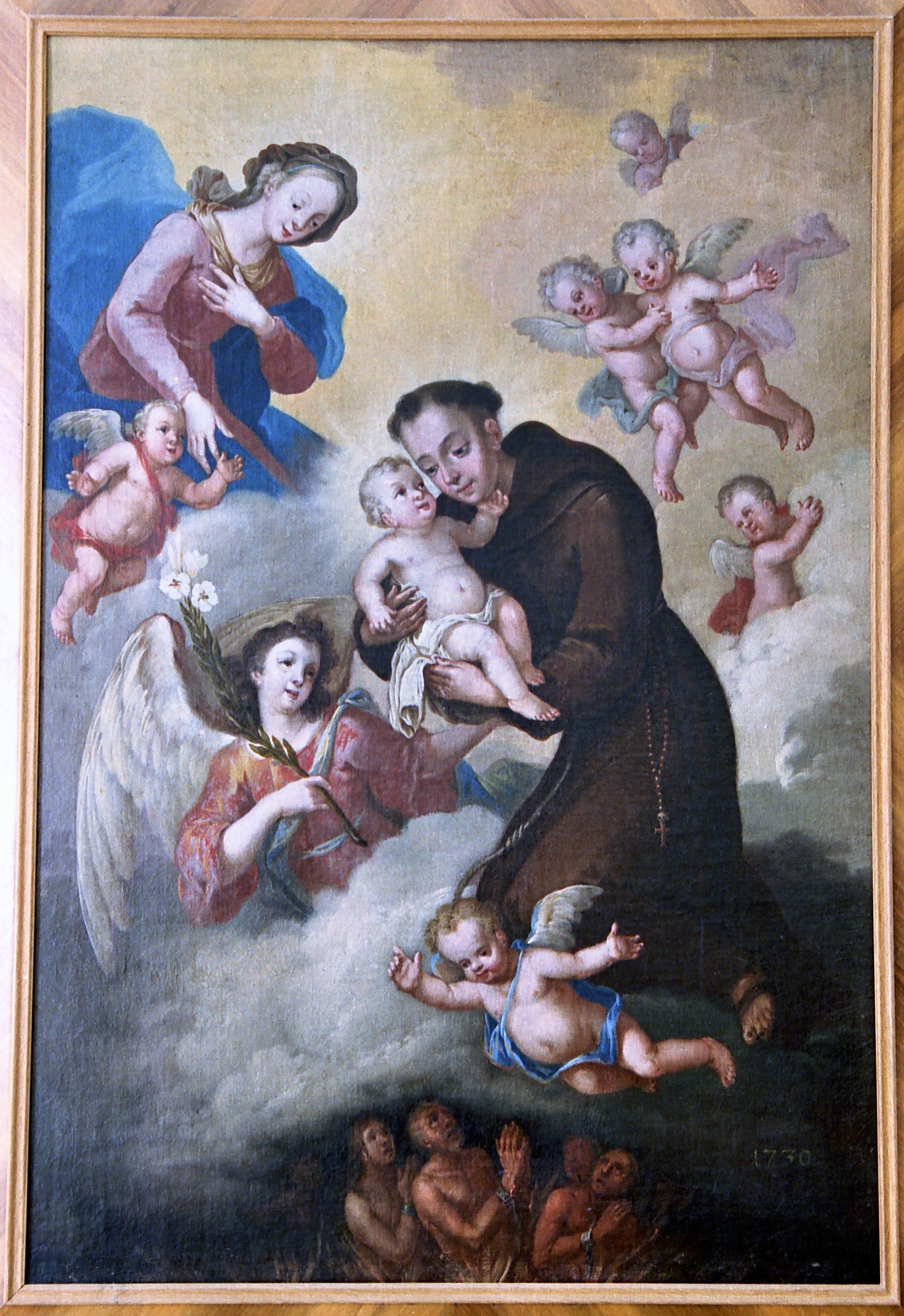
Panel painting at Holzen Abbey in Allmannshofen

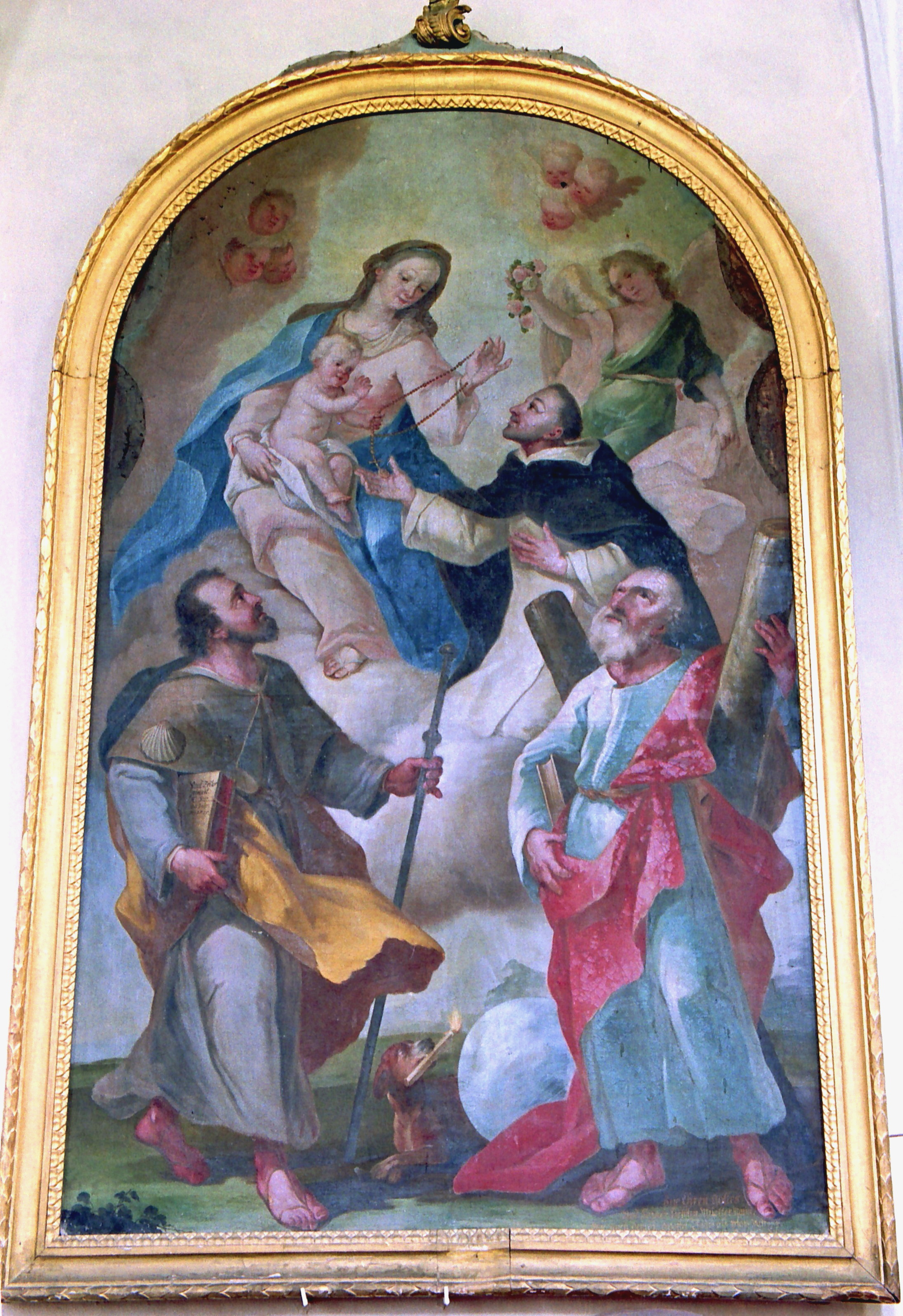
Altarpiece at the Parish Church in Berwang
