= St. Mang's Abbey, Füssen =

Monastery in Bavaria, Germany

Coordinates: 47°34′01″N 10°41′59″E

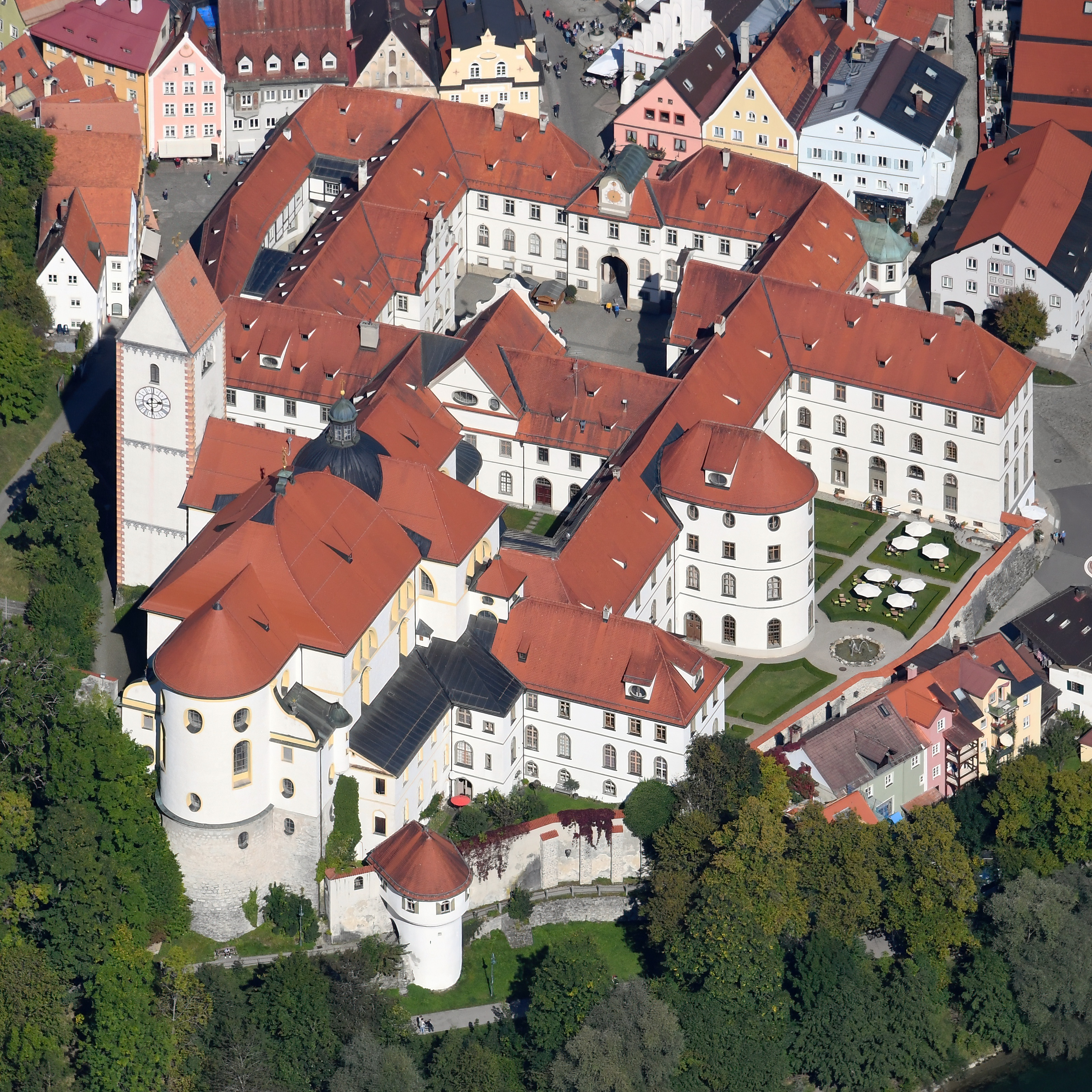
Aerial image of St. Mang's Abbey

St. Mang's Abbey, Füssen or Füssen Abbey (German: Kloster Sankt Mang Füssen) was a Benedictine monastery in Füssen in Bavaria, Germany. It was founded in the 9th century, and dissolved during the post-Napoleonic secularisation of Bavaria.

== History ==
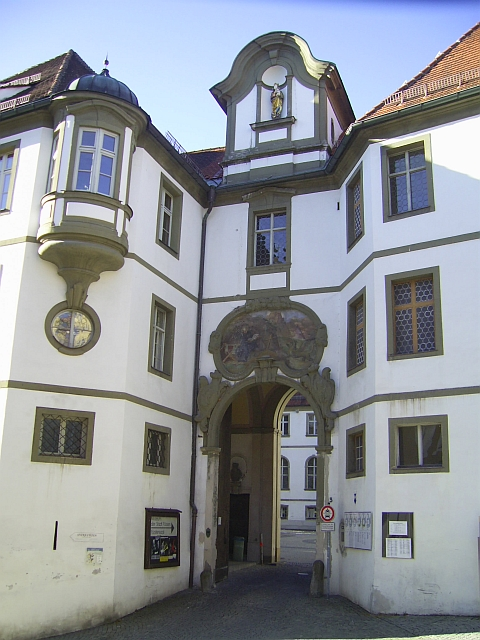
Former St Mang Abbey Main Entrance

The Benedictine abbey of Saint Mang was founded in the first half of the 9th century as a proprietary monastery of the Prince-Bishops of Augsburg. The reason for its foundation goes back to the hermit Magnus of Füssen (otherwise known as Saint Mang) and his Benedictine brother Theodor, both from the Abbey of Saint Gall, who built a cell and an oratory here, where he died on 6 September, although there is no record of which year.

The saint's body, amid miracles, was discovered uncorrupted, a proof of his sanctity, and the veneration of St. Mang was the spiritual basis of the monastery.

The foundation was not however solely spiritually motivated; there were practical political reasons underlying it as well. The monastery's key position not only on the important medieval road from Augsburg across the Alps to Upper Italy but also in the Füssen Gap ("Füssener Enge", the point where the river Lech breaks out of the Alps) gave it an immense strategic value, which made it of political concern both to the Bishops of Augsburg and to the Holy Roman Emperors.

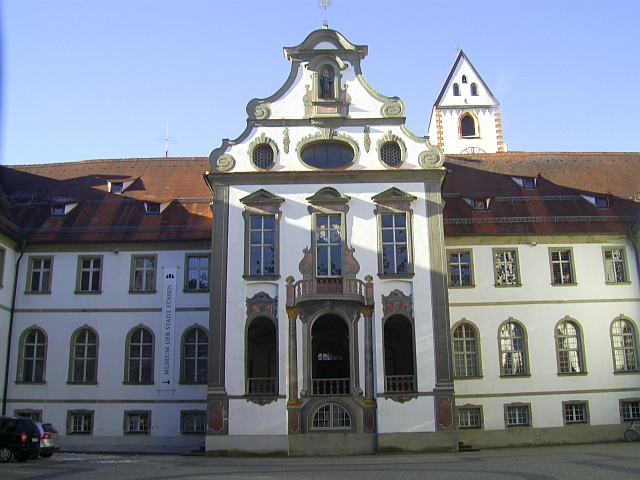
Inner courtyard of the former Abbey

The history of the abbey in the Middle Ages is principally marked by the efforts of the religious community to maintain a life true to the Rule of Saint Benedict amidst the various pressures caused by external social developments. Over time therefore the monks repeatedly embraced various reforms and reforming movements intended to bring about a return to the essentials of the Benedictine life. These reforms mostly resulted in spiritual and economic growth and an increase in the headcount, which in turn brought more building and commissions of artwork.

The energy of the Counter-Reformation found lasting expression in the construction of an enormous Baroque abbey complex between 1696 and 1726, commissioned by Abbot Gerhard Oberleitner (1696-1714), which still today, along with the High Castle (Hohe Schloss), characterises the town of Füssen.

The architect Johann Jakob Herkomer (1652-1717) succeeded in turning the irregular medieval abbey premises into a symmetrically organised complex of buildings. The transformation of the medieval basilica into a Baroque church based on Venetian models was intended to be an architectural symbol of the veneration of Saint Magnus. The entire church represents an enormous reliquary. For the first time in South German Baroque construction the legend of the local saint inspires the suite of frescoes throughout the entire church. The community at the time also set out to make the new church the envy of connoisseurs for the quality of its artworks. Among the artists who contributed various forms of decoration for the building were Anton Sturm, Franz Georg Hermann, Jakob Hiebeler and Paul Zeiller, whose only extant oil paintings are in the Chapter Hall.

Although the abbey was never able to obtain the coveted Reichsunmittelbarkeit (independence of all lordship except for that of the Emperor), it had a decisive influence as a centre of lordship and economy, cultural and faith life, on Füssen and the whole region.

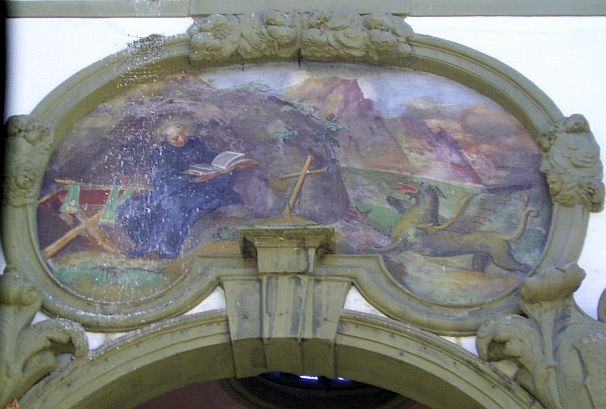
Fresco above main entrance of former St Mang Abbey

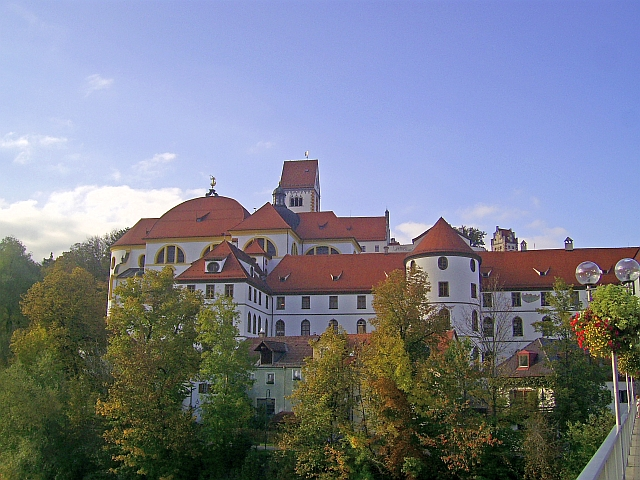
St Mang Basilica and Former St Mang Abbey

== Dissolution ==
On 11 December 1802, during the secularisation that followed the Napoleonic Wars and the Peace of Lunéville, the princes of Oettingen-Wallerstein were awarded possession of St. Mang. On 15 January 1803 Princess Wilhelmine ordered Abbot Aemilian Hafner to dissolve the abbey and vacate the premises by 1 March of that year.

The contents of the library were shipped off to the new owners down the Lech on rafts. Most of the items are now in the library of the University of Augsburg, except for a small collection of especially valuable manuscripts, which are in the Augsburg Diocesan Archives.

== Later history ==
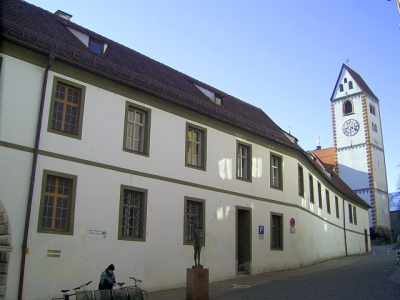
St Mang Basilica, Parish Church, next to the former St Mang Abbey

In 1837 the former abbey church was transferred as a gift to the parish of Füssen. In 1839 the Royal Bavarian chamberlain, Christoph Friedrich von Ponickau, bought the remaining lordship of St. Mang. In 1909 the town of Füssen acquired the Ponickau estate, including the former abbey buildings (apart from the church).

The north wing was used as the town hall. In the south wing the Füssen Town Museum is now located, with displays on the history of the abbey and of the town, particularly of the traditional manufacture of lutes and violins in Füssen. It is also possible to view the Baroque reception rooms of the abbey in the museum.

== List of the abbots of St. Mang's Abbey, Füssen ==
Until 919 there is no documentary evidence of the abbots of this abbey. Abbey tradition names Saint

Magnus as the founding abbot, and his successor as Blessed Conrad.

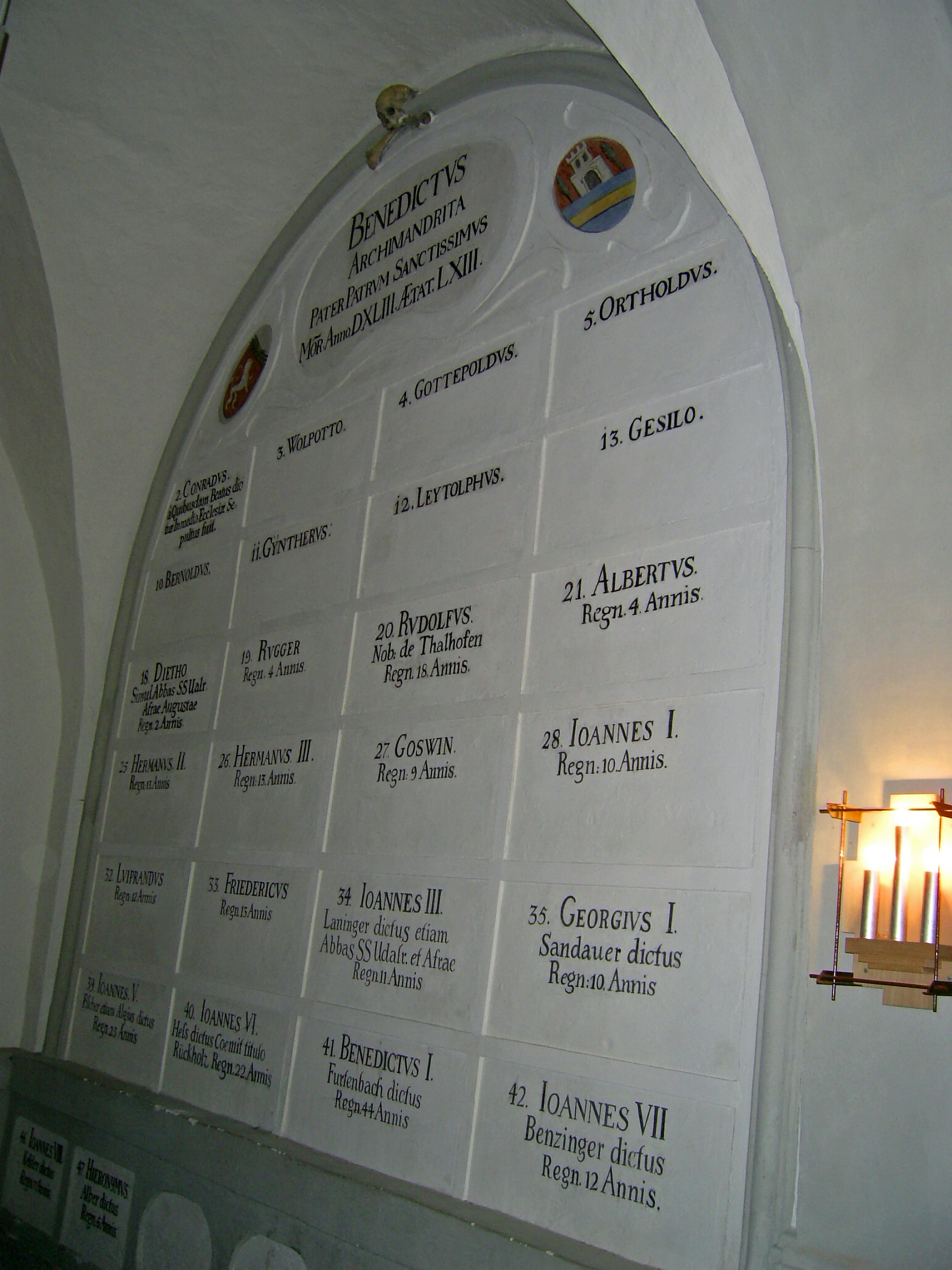
List of Abbots in the Crypt of St Mang Basilica where they are buried

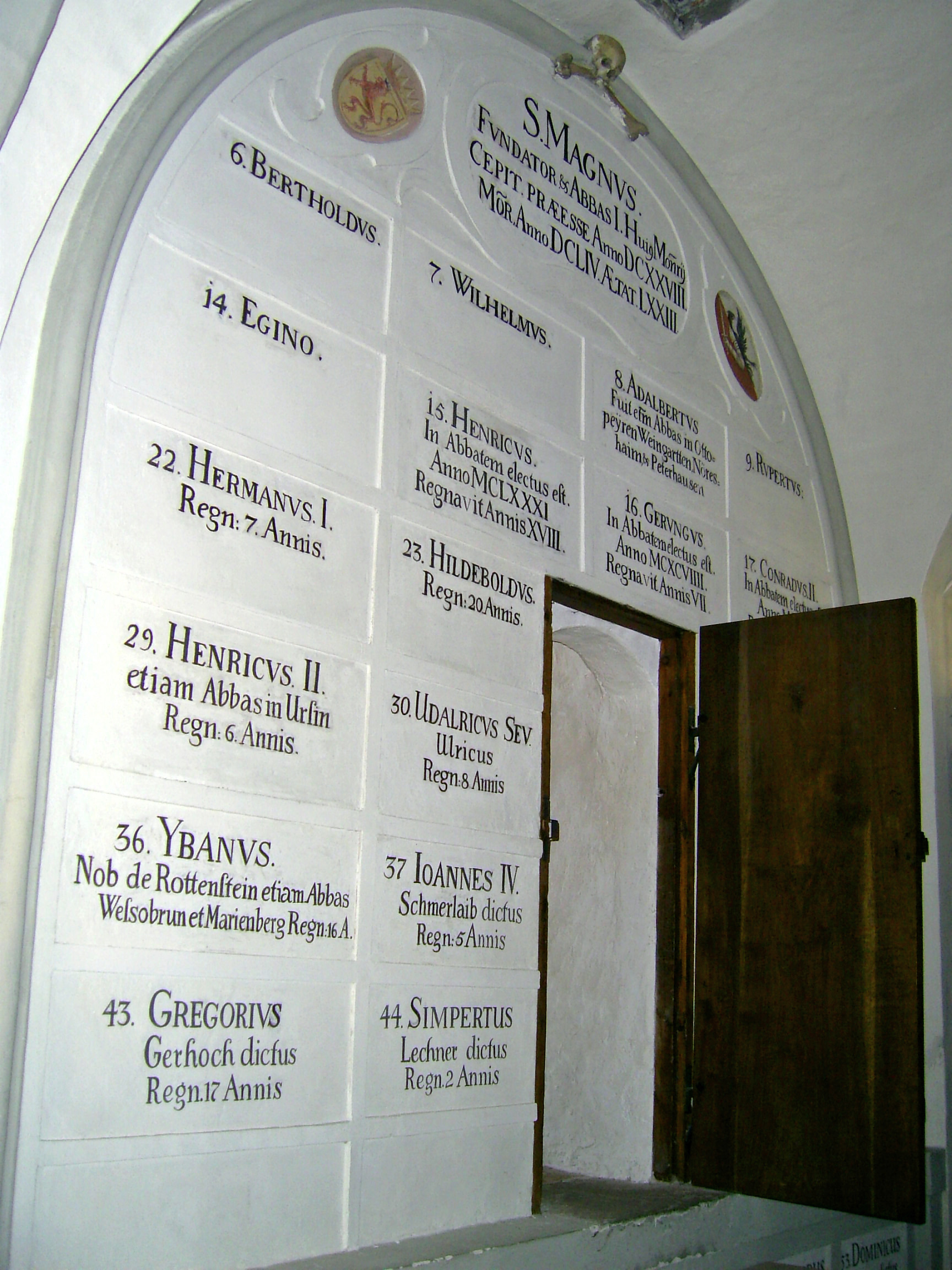
List of Abbots in the Crypt of St Mang Basilica where they are buried

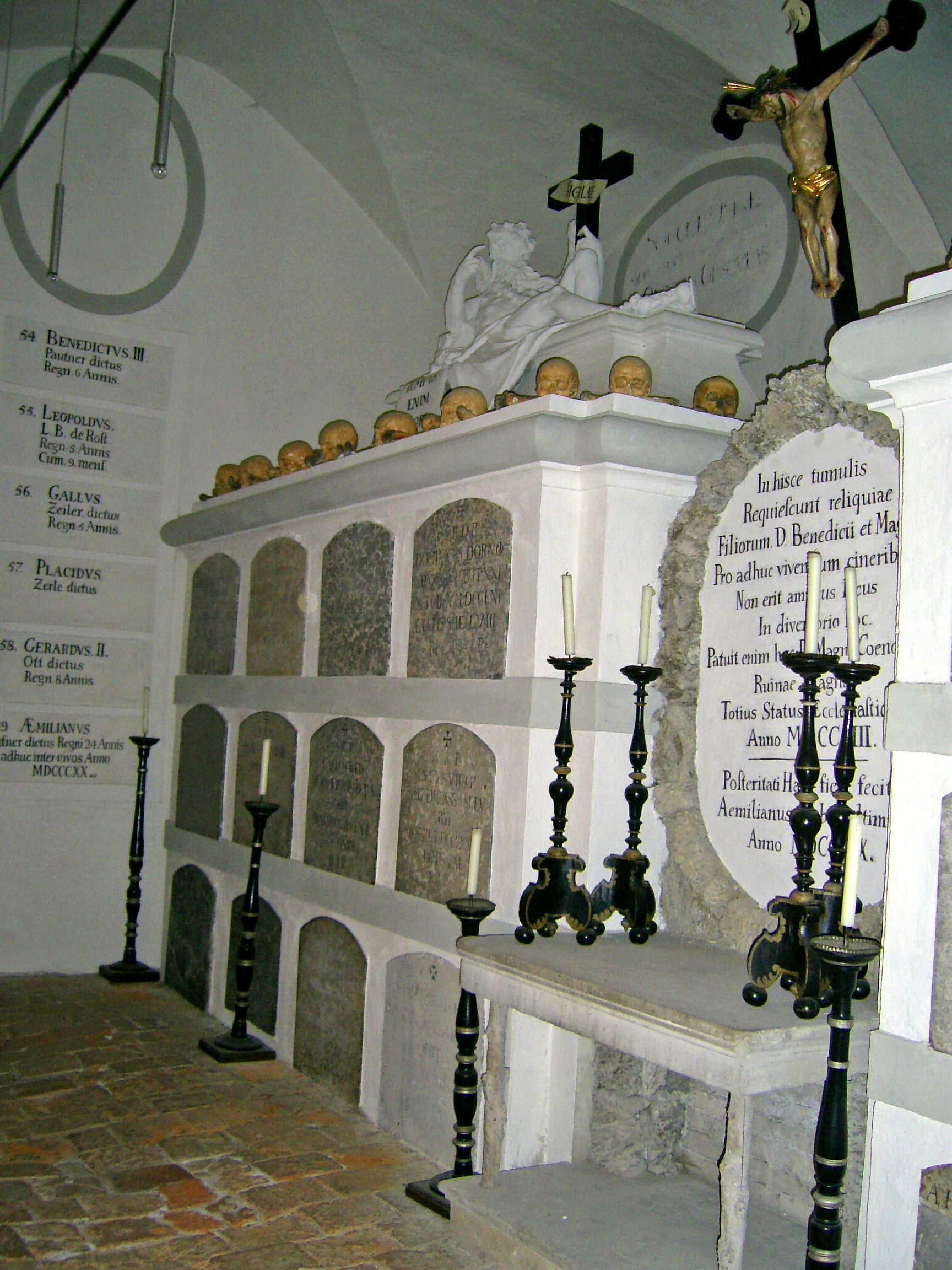
Burial place of Abbots in the Crypt of St Mang Basilica

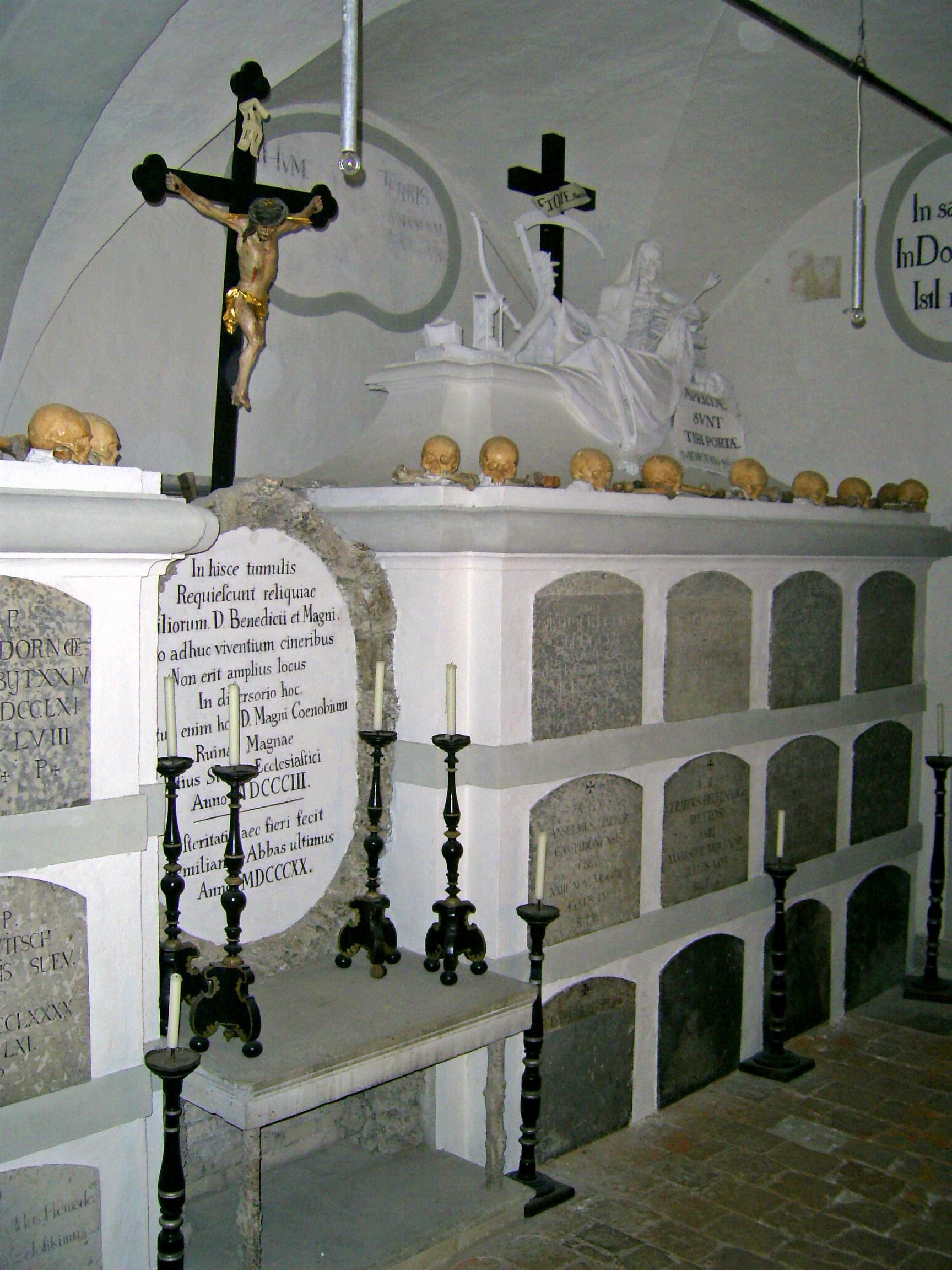
Burial place of Abbots in the Crypt of St Mang Basilica

Abbot	Period of authority	Date of death
1. Saint Magnus		6 September
2. Konrad I		
3. Wolpoto	9th century ?	26 April
4. Bernold	9th century ?	
5. Leutolph	9th century ?	
6. Gisilo	occurs 919	
7. Ortolf		5 April
8. Heinrich I.		
9. Gotebold		
10. Berthold		23 August
11. Adalbert		
12. Wilhelm	c. 1030–1040	
13. Eberhard	c. 1060–1061	11 May 1091
14. Swidker		
15. Adalhalm	1086	25 August 1094
16. Alberich		23 January
17. Konrad II	occurs 1160–c.1175	
18. Heinrich II	occurs 1178–1191	19 February
19. Konrad III	occurs 1206, 1218	14 July, c. 1218
20. Dieto (Theodo)	occurs 1219, 1222	March 1225
21. Rugger	occurs 1227	
22. Rudolf von Thalhofen	occurs 1235, 1251	22 May
23. Albert	occurs 1255	13 March 1256
24. Hermann I	occurs 1257, 1262	
25. Hiltebold	occurs 1263, 1283	19 October 1284
26. Konrad IV	occurs 1284, 1285	
27. Hermann II	occurs 1287, 1295, 1311	
28. Goswin	occurs 1313, 1317	8 July, c. 1318
29. Heinrich III	occurs 1319, 1335	December, c. 1336
30. Ulrich Denklinger	occurs 1336, 1339	18 January 1347
31. Johannes I Hochschlitz	c. 1347	11 August
32. Luiprand	occurs 1374	
33. Friedrich	occurs 1390	28 April
34. Johannes II Lauginger	occurs 1392, 1396	21 March 1403
35. Georg I Sandauer	1397–1410	15 February 1410
36. Yban von Rotenstein	1410–1426	19 May 1439
37. Johannes III Schmerlaib	1426–1431	16 May 1431
38. Konrad V Klammer	1431–1433	13 March 1433
39. Johannes IV Fischer	occurs 1436; res. 1458	30 March 1460
40. Johannes V Hess	1458–1480	1481
41. Benedikt I Furtenbach	1480–1524	March 1531
42. Joh. Baptist VI Benzinger	1524–1533	8 April 1537
43. Gregor Gerhoch	1537–1554	4 October 1554
44. Sympert Lechler	1554–1556	21 November 1560
45. Georg II Albrecht	1556–1560	2 February 1560
46. Johannes VII Kessler	1560–1567	8 June 1567
47. Hieronymus Alber	1567–1573	17 August 1573
48. Matthias Schober	1579–1604	15 August 1604
49. Heinrich IV Amman	1604–1611	30 July 1615
50. Martin Stempfle	1614–1661	26 February 1665
51. Benedikt II Bauer	1661–1696	26 July 1696
52. Gerhard I Oberleitner	1696–1714	20 March 1714
53. Dominikus Dierling	1714–1738	4 September 1738
54. Benedikt III Pautner	1738–1745	18 January 1745
55. Leopold Freiherr von Rost	1745–1750	7 November 1750
56. Gallus Zeiler	1750–1755	7 January 1755
57. Placidus Zerle	1755–1763	24 June 1770
58. Gerhard II Ott	1763–1778	1 March 1778
59. Aemilian Hafner	1778–1803	19 May 1823

== See also ==
- 18th-century Western domes

== Sources ==
- Lindner, Pirmin, 1913. Monasticon Episcopatus Augustani antiqui. Bregenz.
- Ettelt, Rudibert, 1971. Geschichte der Stadt Füssen. Füssen.
- Leistle, David. Die Aebte des St. Magnusstiftes in Füssen, in Studien und Mitteilungen zur Geschichte des Benediktinerordens und seiner Zweige, 1918-1920.
- Riedmiller, Thomas, 2003: Das ehemalige Benediktinerkloster Sankt Mang in Füssen in Klosterland Bayerisch Schwaben (ed. W. Schiedermair). Lindenberg. ISBN 3-89870-127-1
