= Balthasar Riepp =

German-Austrian painter

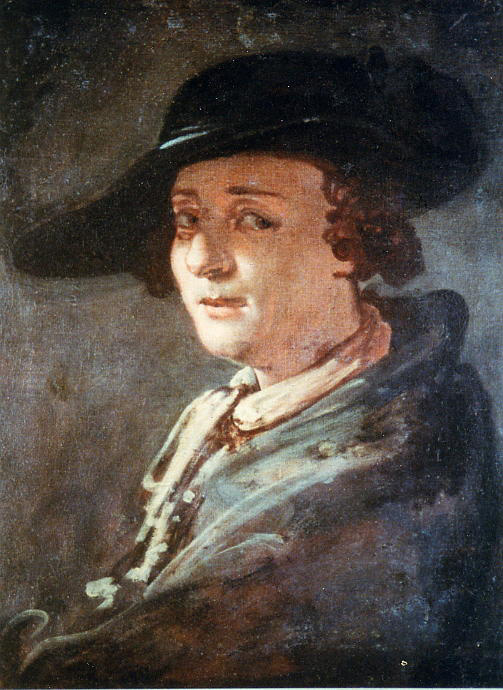
Self-portrait (c.1735)

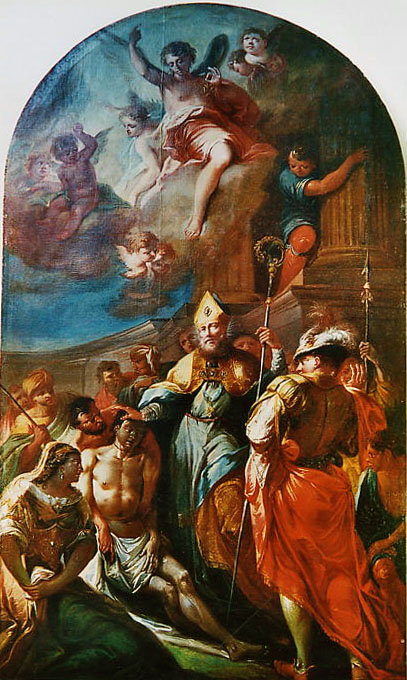
Miracle of Saint Ulrich (c.1730), at the parish church in Pinswang

Balthasar Riepp (22 November 1703, Kempten - 2 August 1764 in Vils) was a German-Austrian painter, primarily of religious subjects.

== Life ==
Riepp's father was a servant at the Fürstäbtliche Residenz (a monastery complex) in Kempten. Prince-Abbot Rupert von Bodman helped provide him with a basic education, which included drawing lessons from the court painter Franz Benedikt Hermann. In 1725, after some time as an apprentice to Jacob Carl Stauder, he took a two-year study trip to Italy, courtesy of a stipend from Anselm Reichlin von Meldegg, the new Prince-abbott.

In 1728, Riepp was offered employment in the highly successful workshop of Paul Zeiller in Reutte, County of Tyrol. Seven years later, he married Zeiller's daughter, Maria Anna. By that time, he was a sought-after artist with students of his own. In 1738, when Zeiller died, Riepp took over management of his art school.

In 1740, shortly after obtaining his Bürgerrechtes (citizenship) in Reutte, Riepp's only child, Johann Anton Laurentius, died. He began drinking heavily, which led to a separation from his wife and, as his condition worsened, he was accused of offending public morals. Soon, he felt it was necessary to leave Reutte. His dependence on alcohol, combined with his generosity toward the needy, slowly reduced him to poverty and homelessness. He died in an emergency shelter in Vils.

Streets in Reutte and Biberbach have been named in Riepp's honor. For the 300th anniversary of his birth in 2003, an exhibition called Genie im Schatten (Genius in the Shadows) toured Kempten, Reutte, Breitenwang and Vils.

== Gallery ==
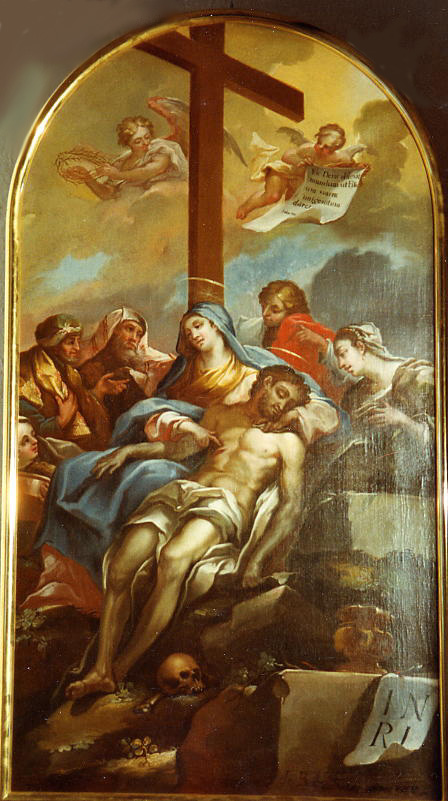
Pieta, 1748

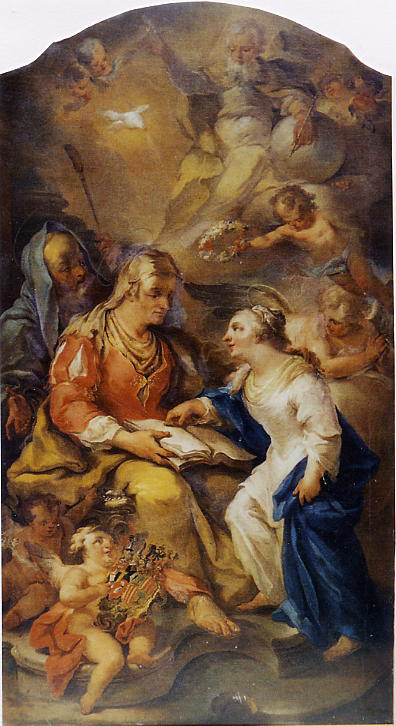
Education of Mary by her mother Saint Anne, 1750

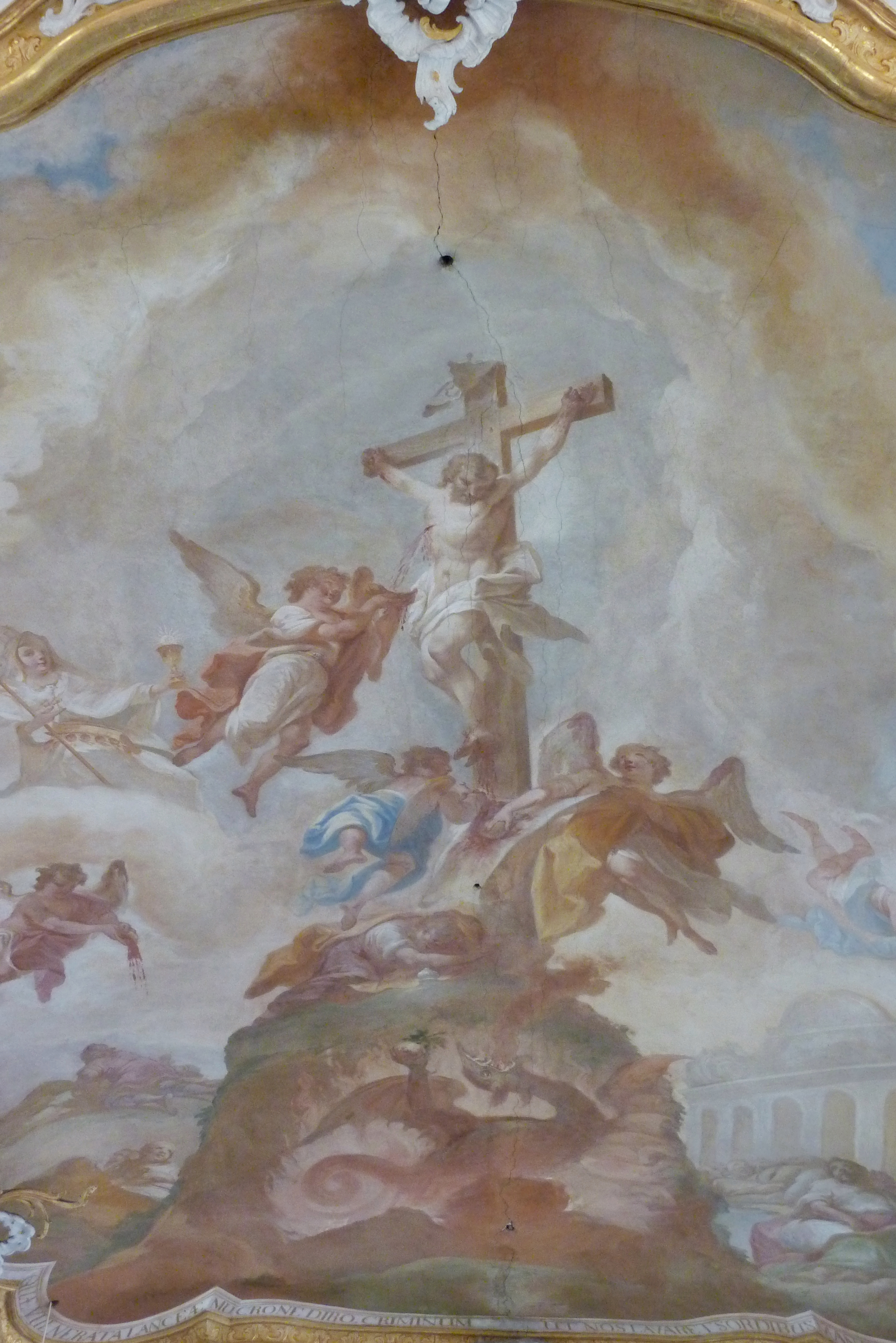
Crucifixion at church of St. James and Laurentius in Biberbach

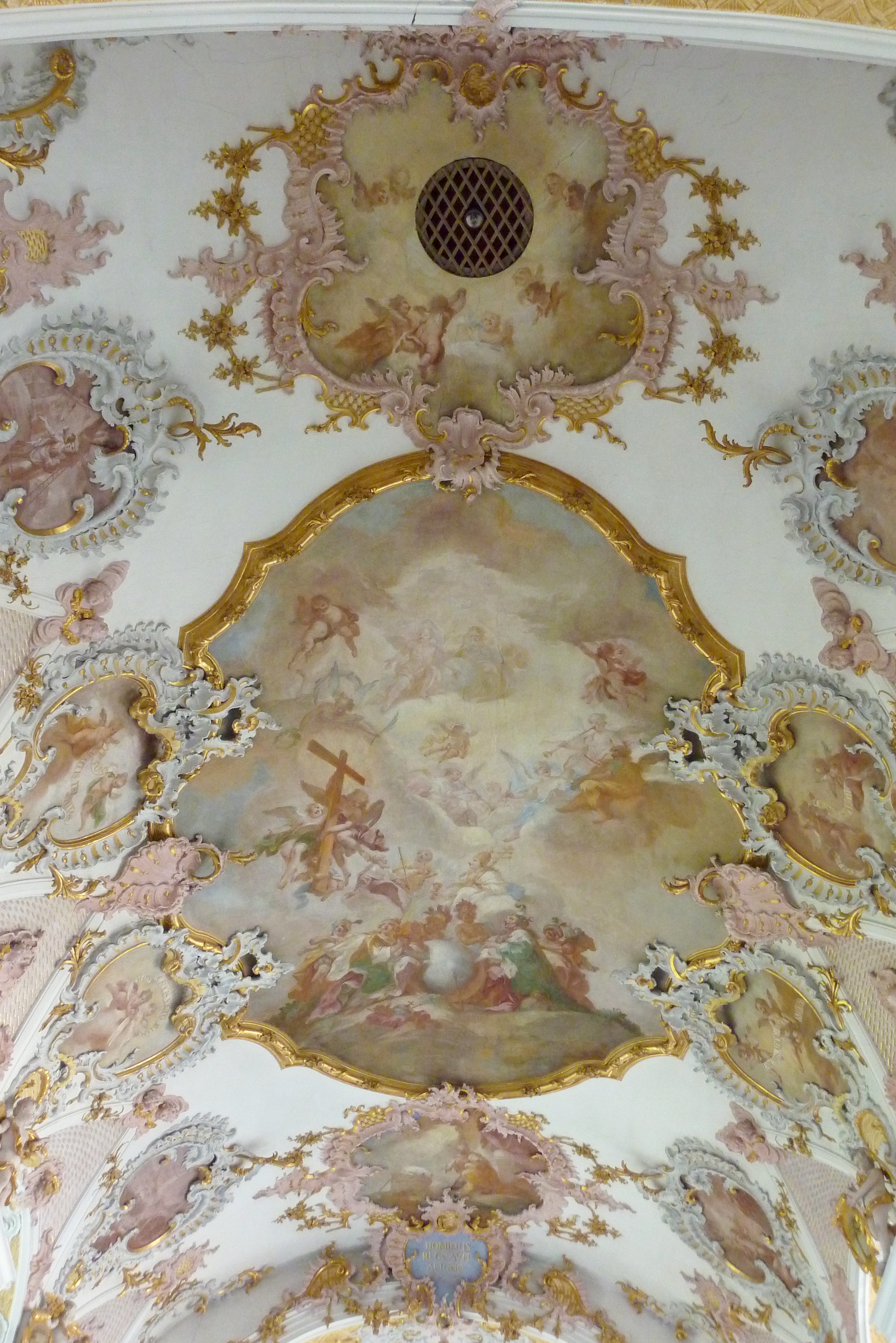
Ceiling fresco at the church of St. James and Laurentius in Biberbach
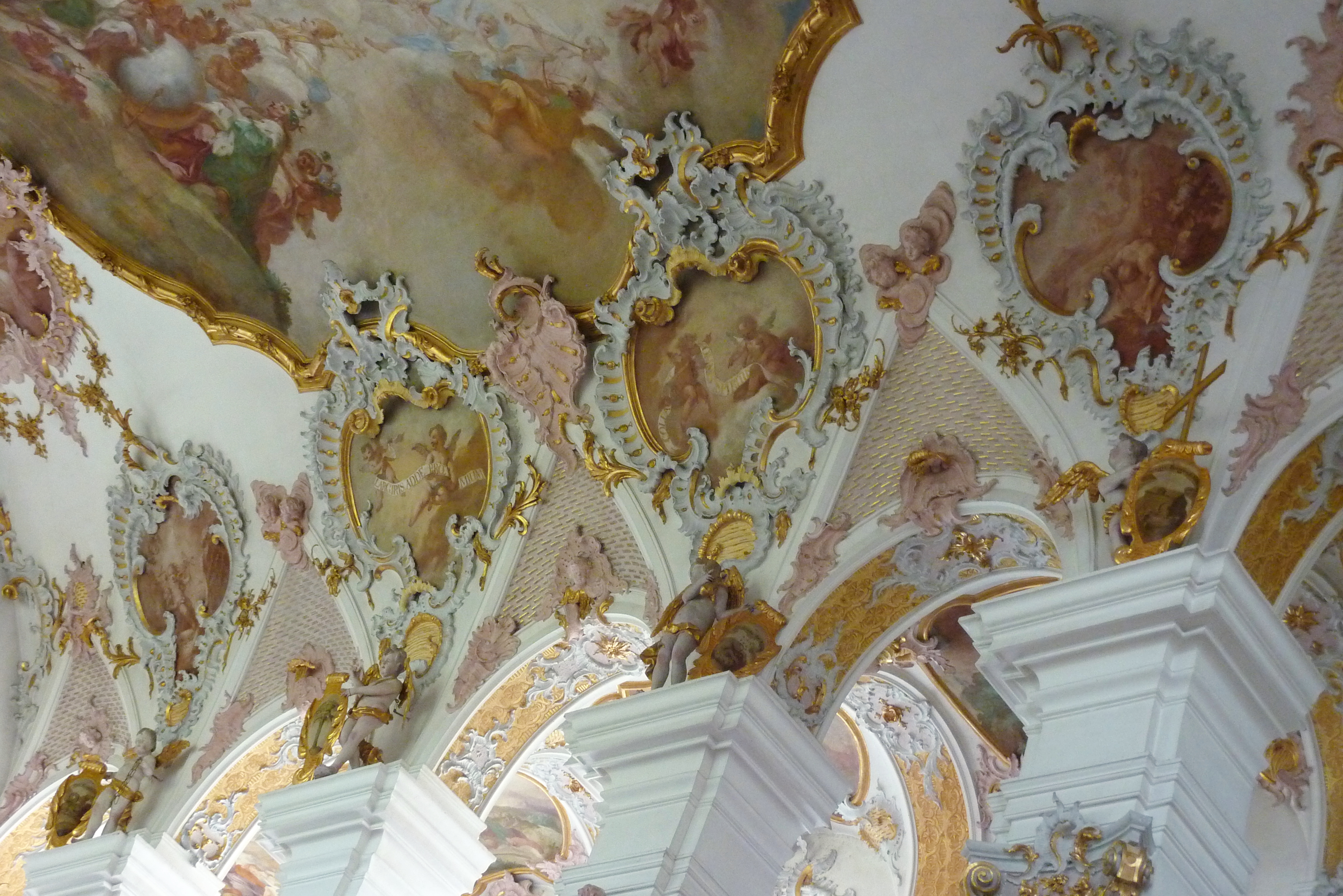
Vault frescos at the church of St. James and Laurentius in Biberbach

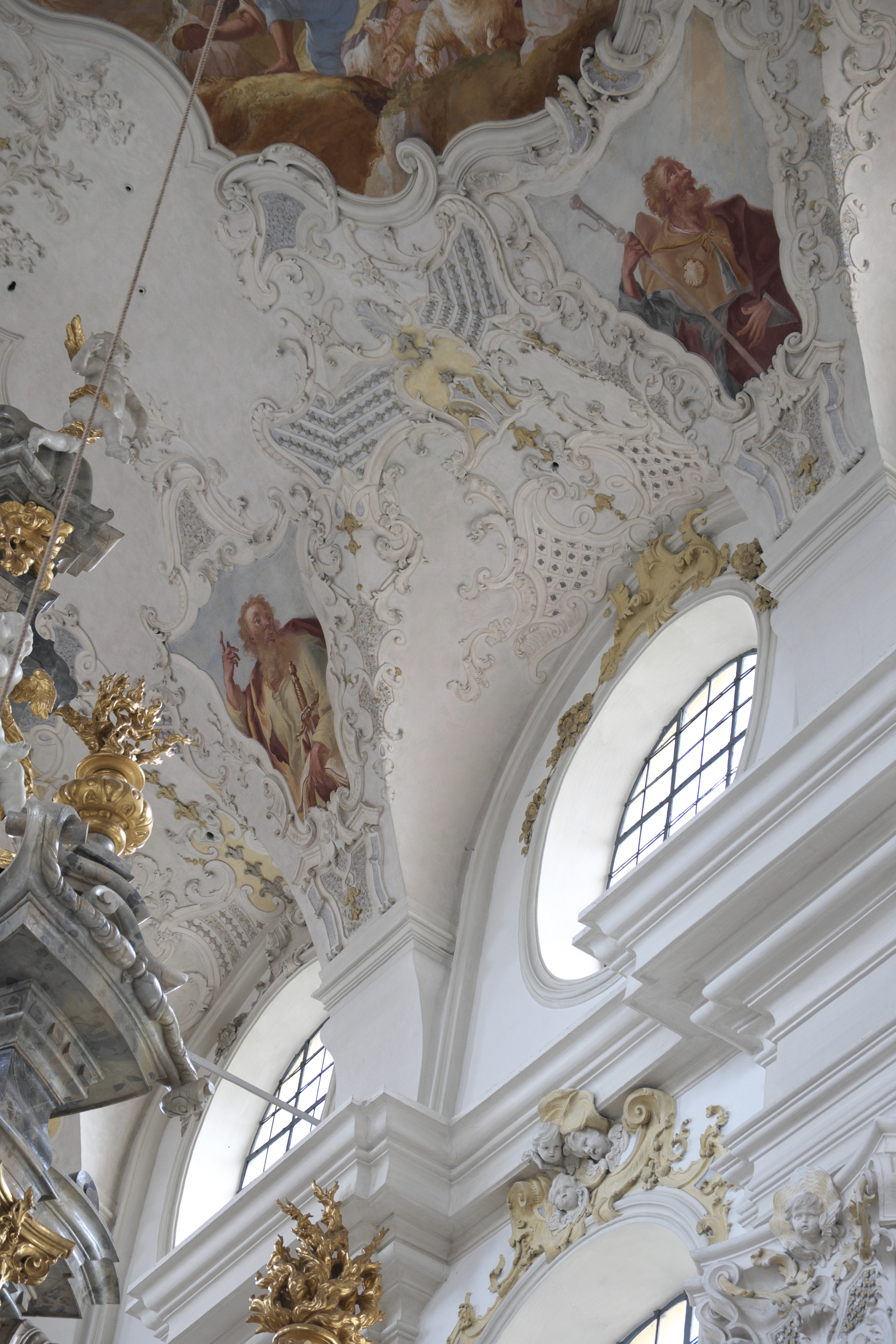
Apostle Paul and James the Elder at the church of St. Martin in Marktoberdorf

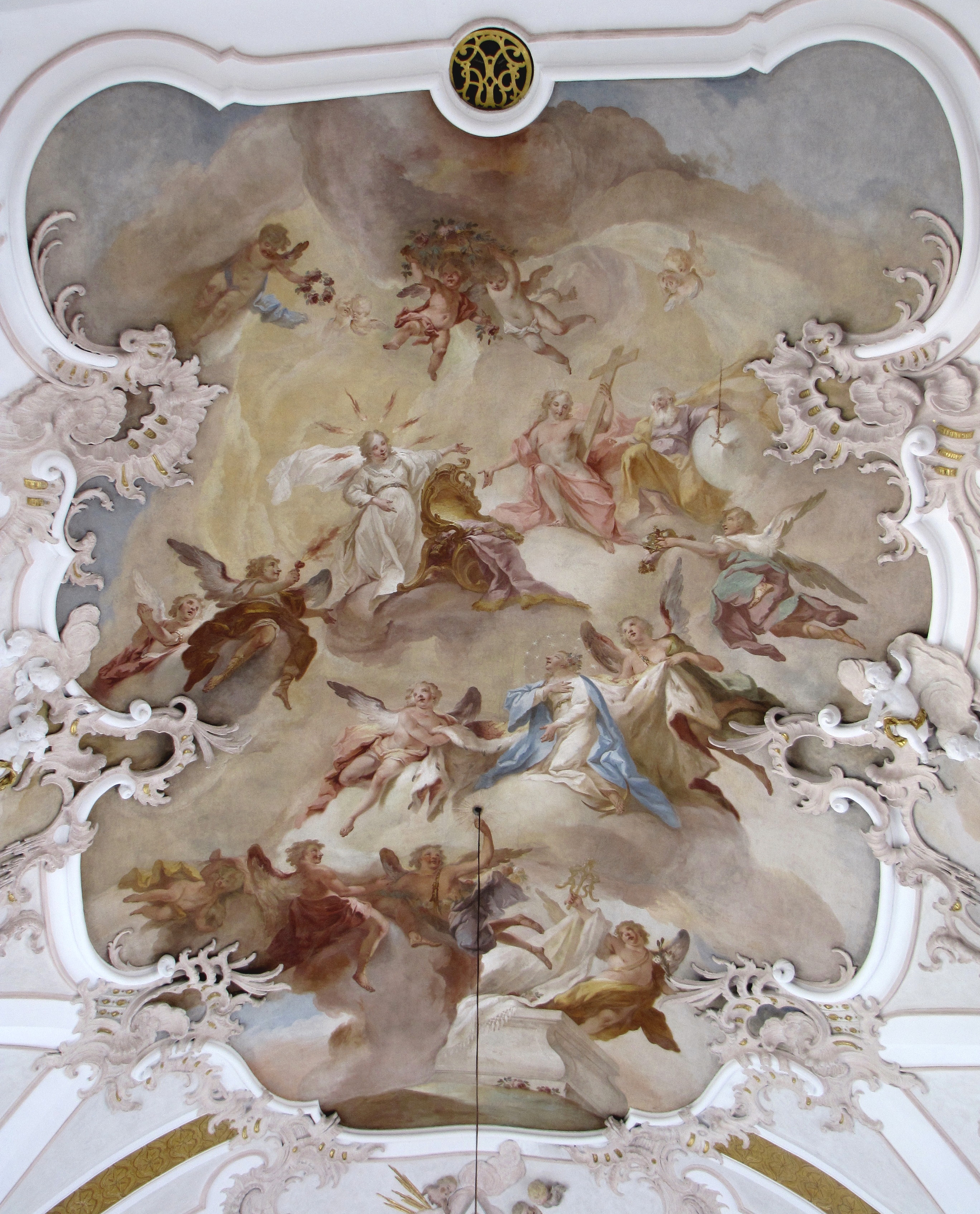
The Assumption of Mary at the church of St. Nikolaus, Großaitingen

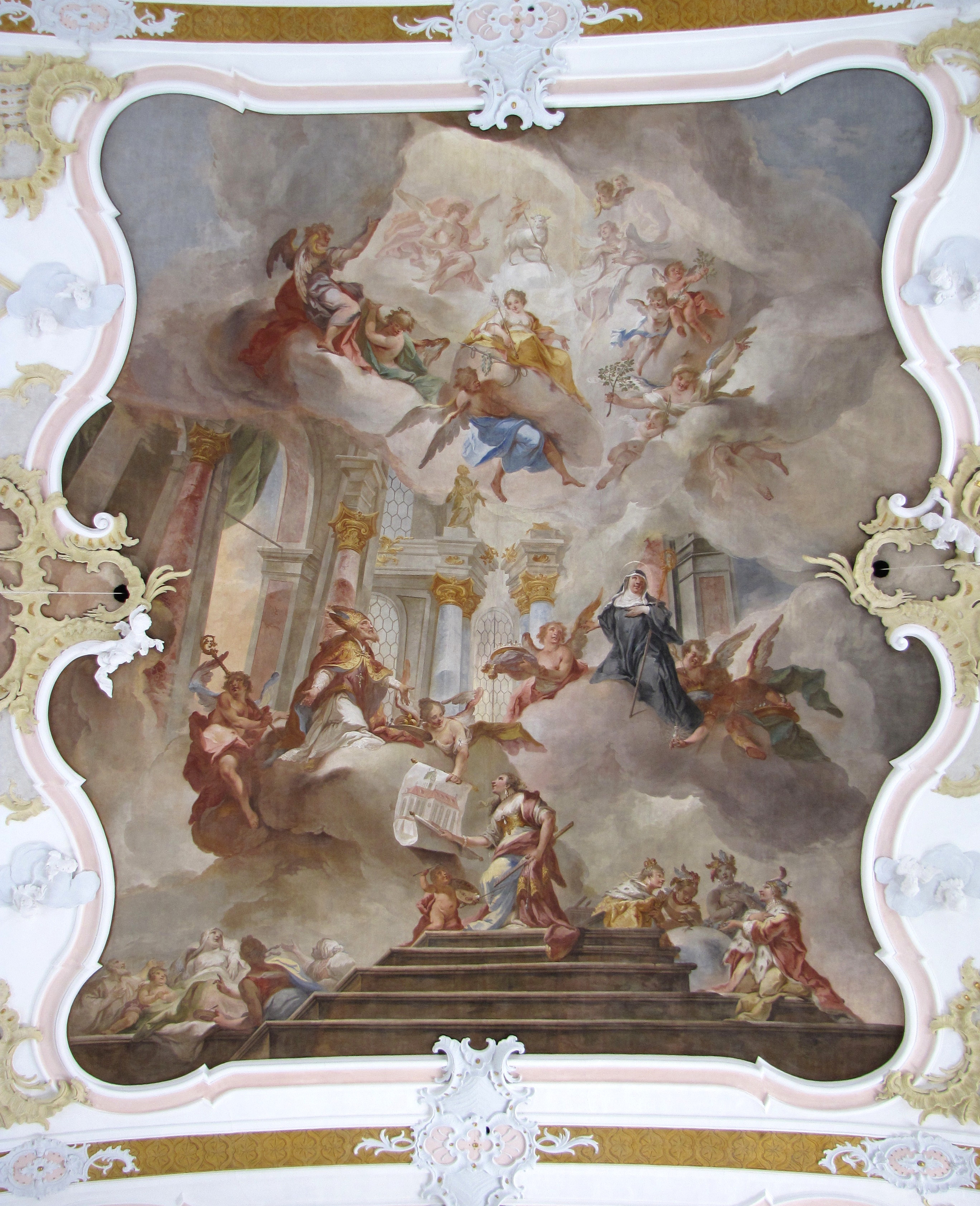
Saints Nicholas and Walpurga as intercessors, church of St. Nikolaus, Großaitingen
