= Johann Georg Reinheimer =

German engraver (1776-1820)

- Born: Johann Georg Reinheimer; 1776; Frankfurt am Main, Holy Roman Empire
- Died: 13 June 1820 (aged 42–43); Frankfurt am Main, Hesse, Germany
- Other name: J. G. Reinheimer
- Occupations: Engraver; Commercial artist
- Known for: Copperplate engraving
- Spouse: Ursula Magdalena Reinheimer (née Prestel)

Johann Georg Reinheimer (1776 – 13 June 1820) was a German copperplate engraver, commercial artist, and art dealer.

== Early life ==
Johann Georg Reinheimer was born in 1776 in Frankfurt am Main, Holy Roman Empire.

== Career ==
Reinheimer trained under the German painter and engraver Johann Gottlieb Prestel, assisting with the Prestel publishing house's work alongside Vienna's Anton Radl. The art dealer married Ursula Magdalena Prestel, the daughter of Maria Katharina and Johann Gottlieb Prestel, on 1 December 1805.

After his father-in-law's death in 1808, Reinheimer's publishing house produced etched and engraved scenes of Frankfurt and nearby areas, based on works by Johann Friedrich Morgenstern and Anton Radl. That year, Reinheimer created an engraving of the Archangel Raphael, based on a 16th-century painting by Pietro Perugino. He was featured in Johann Georg Meusel's 1809 work, German Artists' Lexicon or Directory of Living German Artists. Reinheimer created an engraving of View of Mainz in 1815, based on Caspar Schneider's work, utilizing aquatint, a technique pioneered by Jean-Baptiste Le Prince. His work titled The Cathedral of Frankfurt am Main was acquired in 1867 by Städel Institute, an art museum in Frankfurt.

== Death ==
Johann Georg Reinheimer died on 13 June 1820 in Frankfurt am Main, Germany. Following his death, his widow, Ursula Magdalena, ran the business under her name until her death on 16 April 1845 in Brussels.

== Works ==
- Attack on the City of Mainz before the Siege
- Attack on the City of Frankfurt am Main (after A. Radl)
- Attack on the City of Regensburg (after A. Radl)
- Attack on Caub: Depicting the fortress of Pfalz and Gutenfels Castle (after Christian Georg Schütz)
- Attack on Wallmich on the Rhine
- A Horse Piece (after Johann Georg Pforr)
- The Soldier Captured by Franzofen (after A. Radl)
- The Cathedral of Frankfurt am Main
- The Archangel Raphael (1808)
- View of Mainz (1815)

== Gallery ==
Works by Johann Georg Reinheimer

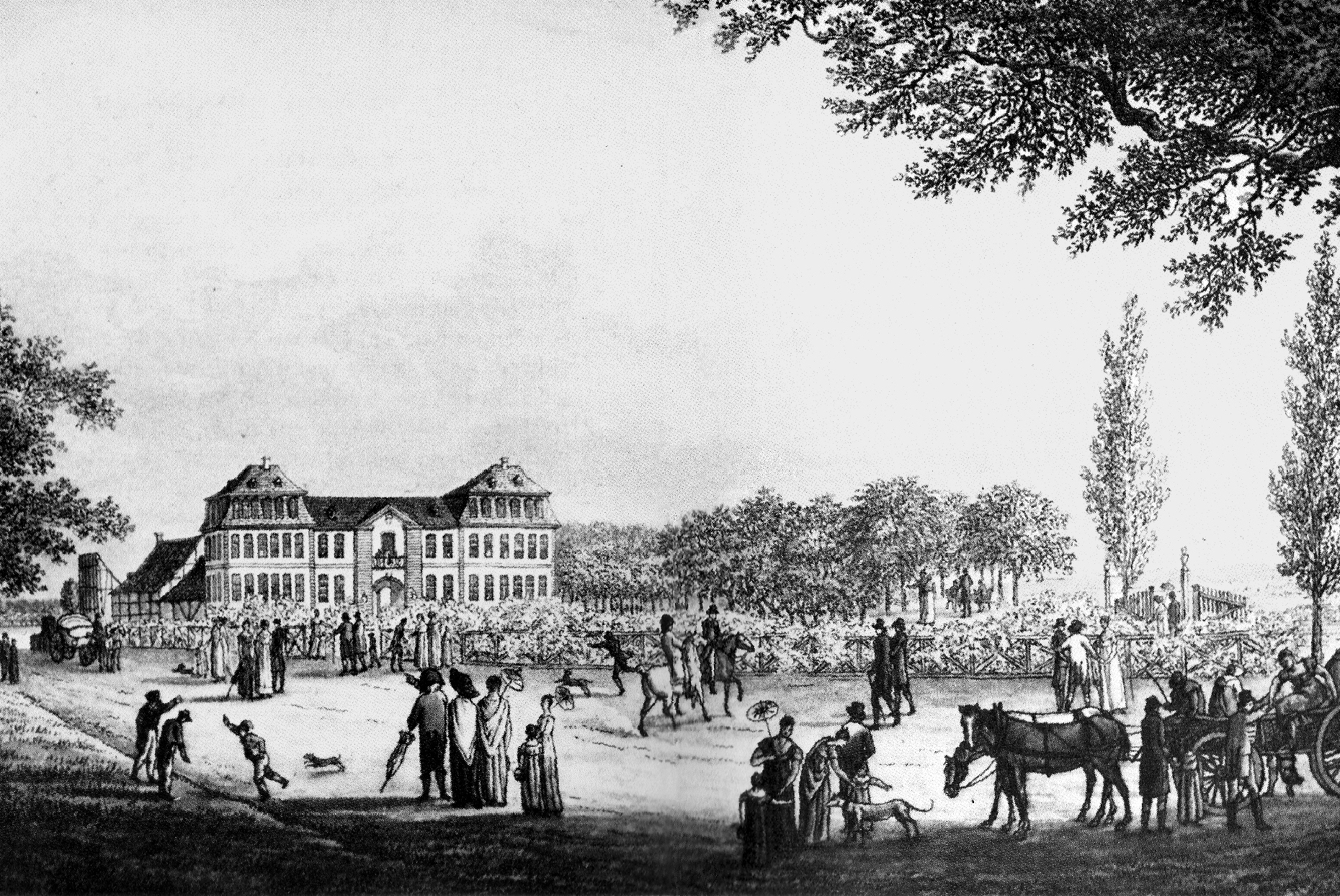
