= Prestel (surname) =

Prestel is a surname. Notable people with the surname include:

- Johann Gottlieb Prestel (1739–1808), German painter
- Maria Katharina Prestel (1747–1794), German painter and wife of Johann
- Robert L. Prestel (born 1936), American intelligence official and mathematician
- Jim Prestel (born 1937), American football player
