= Geroldsau Waterfall =

Waterfall in Geroldsau

Coordinates: 48°42′45.94″N 8°14′58.50″E

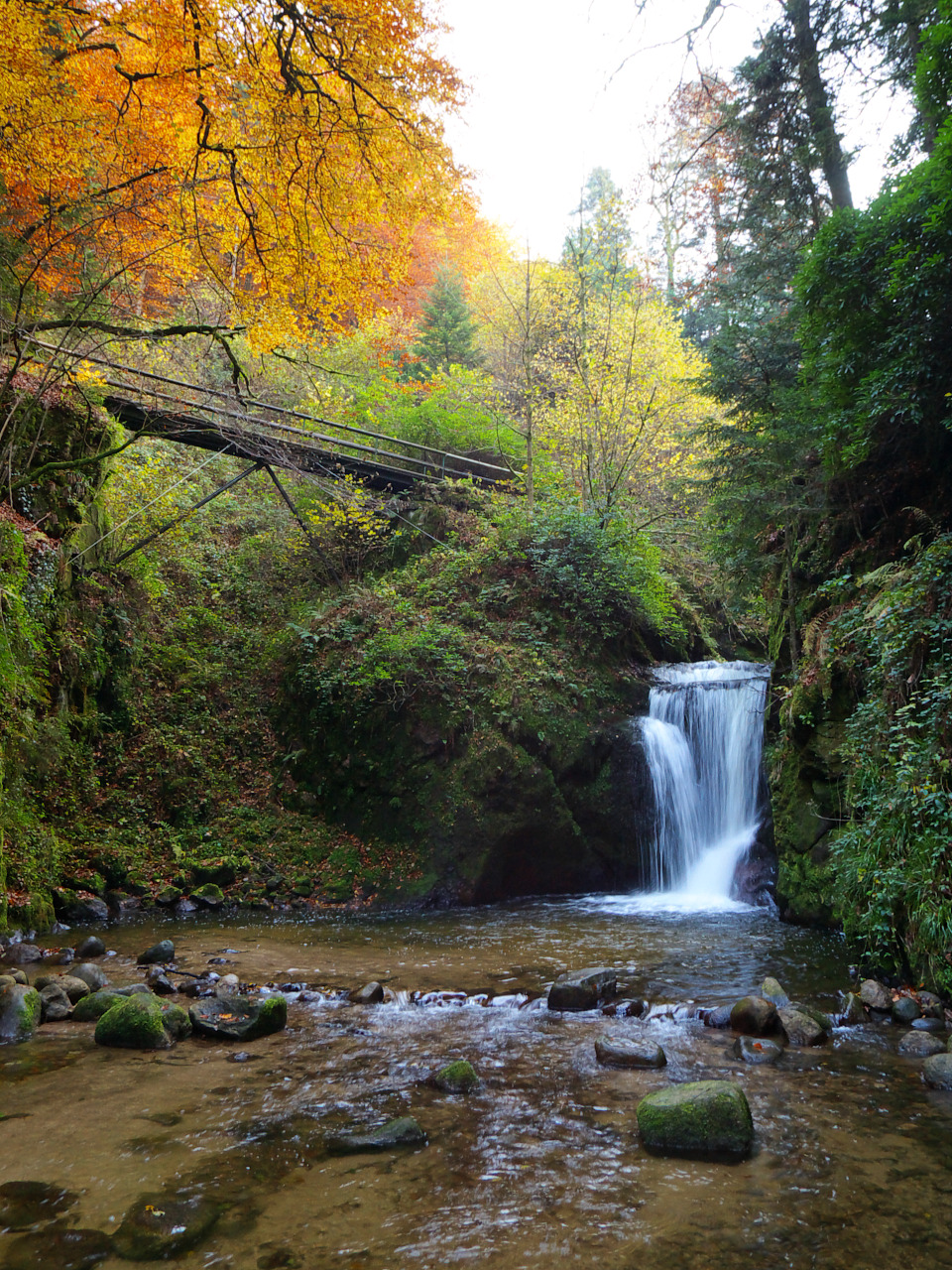
The Geroldsau Waterfall in autumn

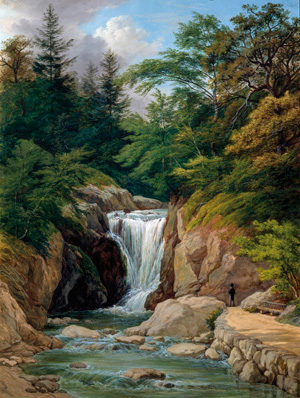
The waterfall in a painting by Anton Radl, 1825

The Geroldsau Waterfall (German: Geroldsauer Wasserfall) is a roughly six-metre-high waterfall on the Grobbach stream south of the Baden-Baden quarter of Geroldsau in the Northern Black Forest.

The Grobbach rises on the rainy western slopes of the northern Black Forest at a height of about 800 m above NN on the Black Forest High Road near Plättig/Bühlerhöhe. It flows northwards and merges before the waterfall with the Harzbach, which, together with its two tributaries, drains the northwestern slopes of the Badener Höhe. At the waterfall the Grobbach has an average flow rate of 0.56 m³/s. It drops here from about 291 m above NHN down to about 285 m. into a small rock bowl. After about a kilometre the V-shaped valley widens into the broad valley bottom of Geroldsau. At its confluence with the Oos in Lichtental the Grobbach is bigger and longer than the Oos.
