= Nothnagel =

Nothnagel is a German surname. Notable people with the surname include:

- Anke Nothnagel (born 1966), East German sprint canoeist
- Dominik Nothnagel (born 1994), German footballer
- Hermann Nothnagel (1841–1905), German internist
- José Sáinz Nothnagel (1907–1984), Spanish politician
- Johann Andreas Benjamin Nothnagel (1729–1804) German Jewish painter
