= Ursula Magdalena Reinheimer =

German painter and engraver (1777-1845)

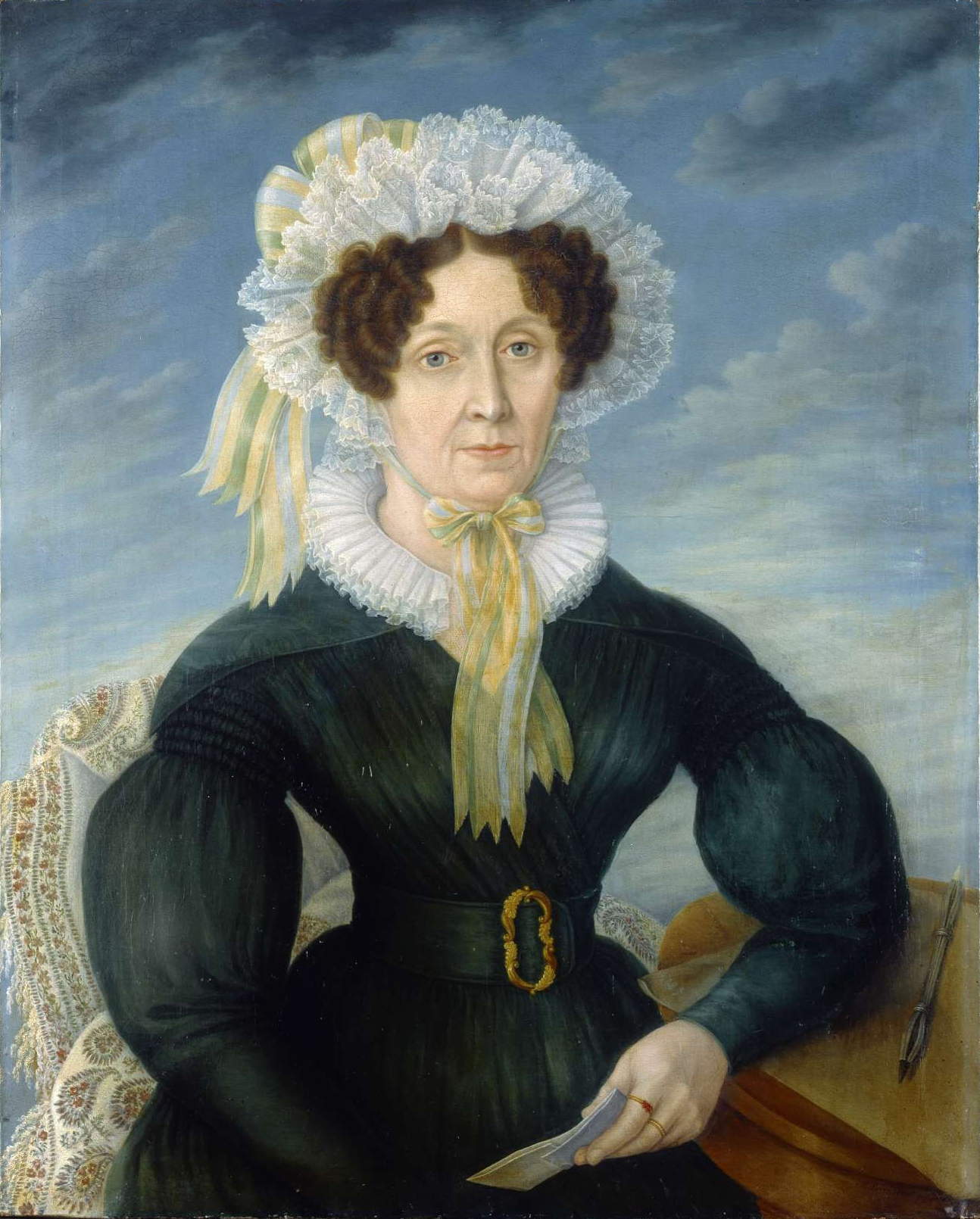
- Born: Ursula Magdalena Reinheimer; 27 November 1777; Nuremberg, Holy Roman Empire
- Died: 16 April 1845 (aged 67); City of Brussels, Belgium
- Occupations: Painter; Engraver
- Known for: Painting; Copperplate engraving
- Spouse: Johann Georg Reinheimer
- Parents: Johann Gottlieb Prestel (father); Maria Katharina Prestel (mother)

Ursula Magdalena Reinheimer (27 November 1777 – 16 April 1845) née Ursula Magdalena Prestel was a German painter and engraver.

== Early life ==
Ursula Magdalena Prestel was born on 27 November 1777 in Nuremberg, Holy Roman Empire (now Bavaria, Germany).

She was the daughter of Maria Katharina Höll and Johann Gottlieb Prestel. Her parents' separation in Frankfurt around 1786 led her to move to London, England with her mother.

== Career ==
With engraving and painting skills learned from her parents, she embraced an artistic path, specializing in portraits, landscapes, floral art, and aquatint etchings. Following her mother's death in 1794, she went back to live with her father in Frankfurt, Germany. During this time, he hired Anton Radl, Johann Georg Reinheimer, and Ursula to assist with copperplate engravings for his publishing house. Accompanying her father and Anton Radl, she journeyed to Söder in 1798, where she stayed until May 1799. She drew most of the landscape prints from the Count of Brabeck's collection for her father's studio and painted for him during her stay.

On 1 December 1805, Johann Georg Reinheimer, an engraver and art dealer, married Ursula Magdalena. Almost 15 years later, her husband died on 13 June 1820 in Frankfurt am Main, Germany. The widow ran the business under her name after his death.

Around 1830, she painted a portrait of Vienna's Anton Radl.

Ursula Magdalena visited France and Switzerland alongside Mrs. von Bethmann Hollweg, wife of August von Bethmann-Hollweg, and grew accustomed to life among the upper class.

== Death ==
Ursula Magdalena Reinheimer died on 16 April 1845 in the City of Brussels, Belgium.

== Works ==
- La Nuit (after van der Neer, aquatint engraving in various tones)
- Forest Scene with Resting Farmers (etching)
- The Rosstrappe (watercolor)
- Nine sheets of flower studies (gouache painting)

== Gallery ==
Works by Ursula Magdalena Reinheimer

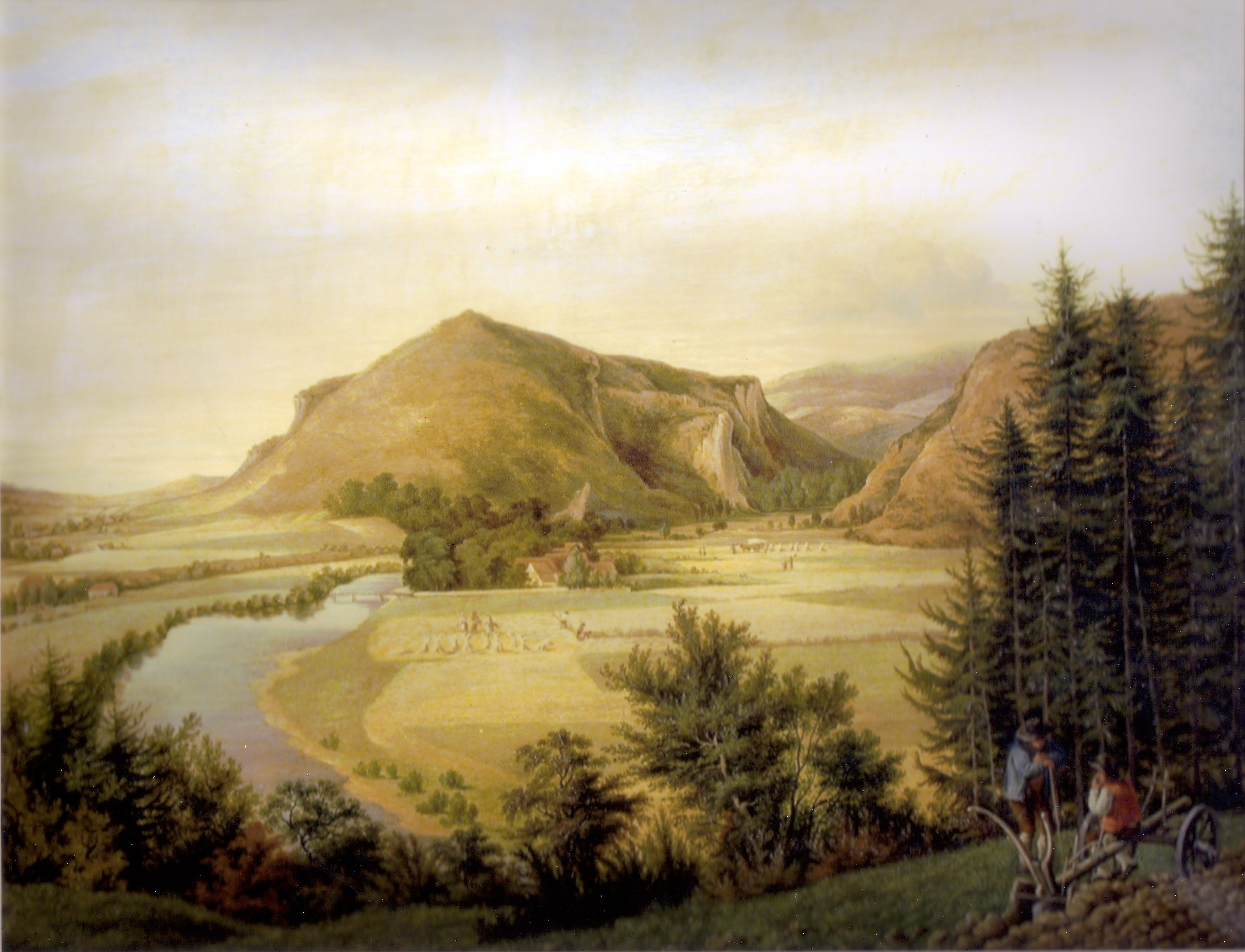
Landschaft aus dem Sauerland, 1802

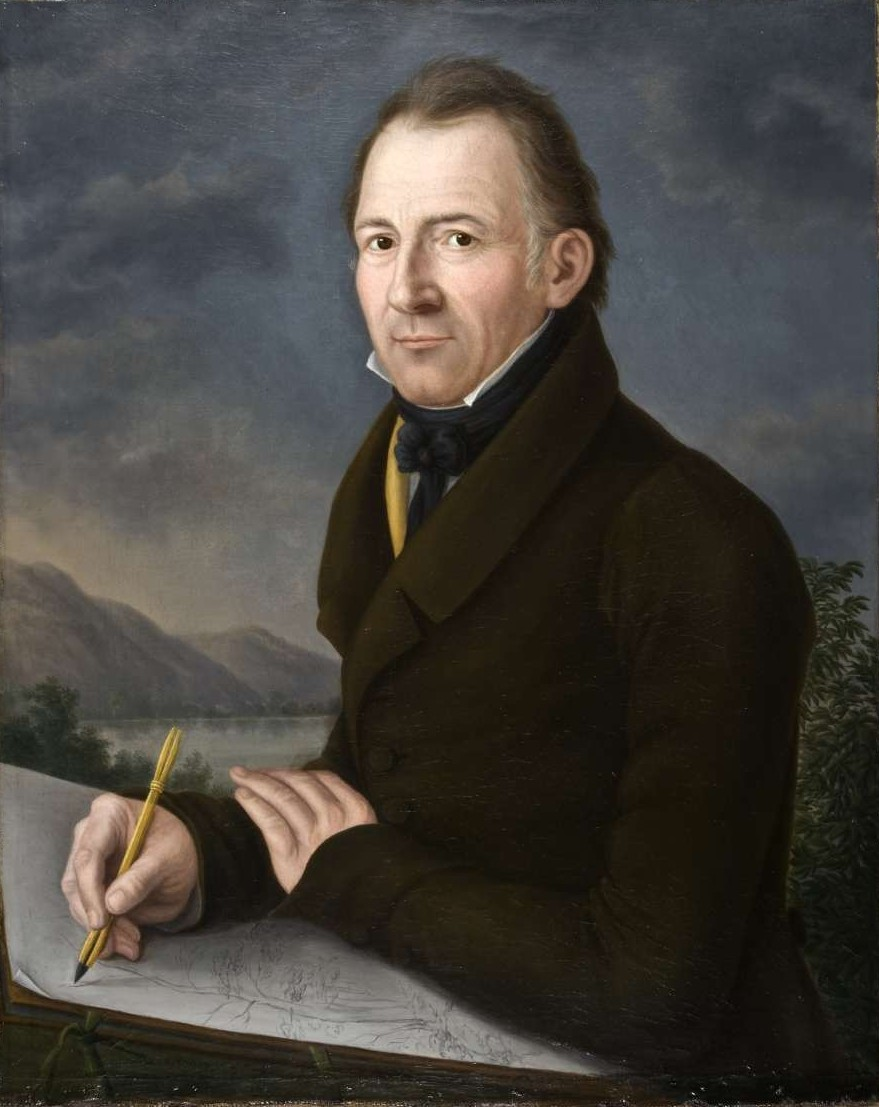
Portrait of Anton Radl, c. 1830
