= Johann Gottlieb Prestel =

German painter and engraver (1739–1808)

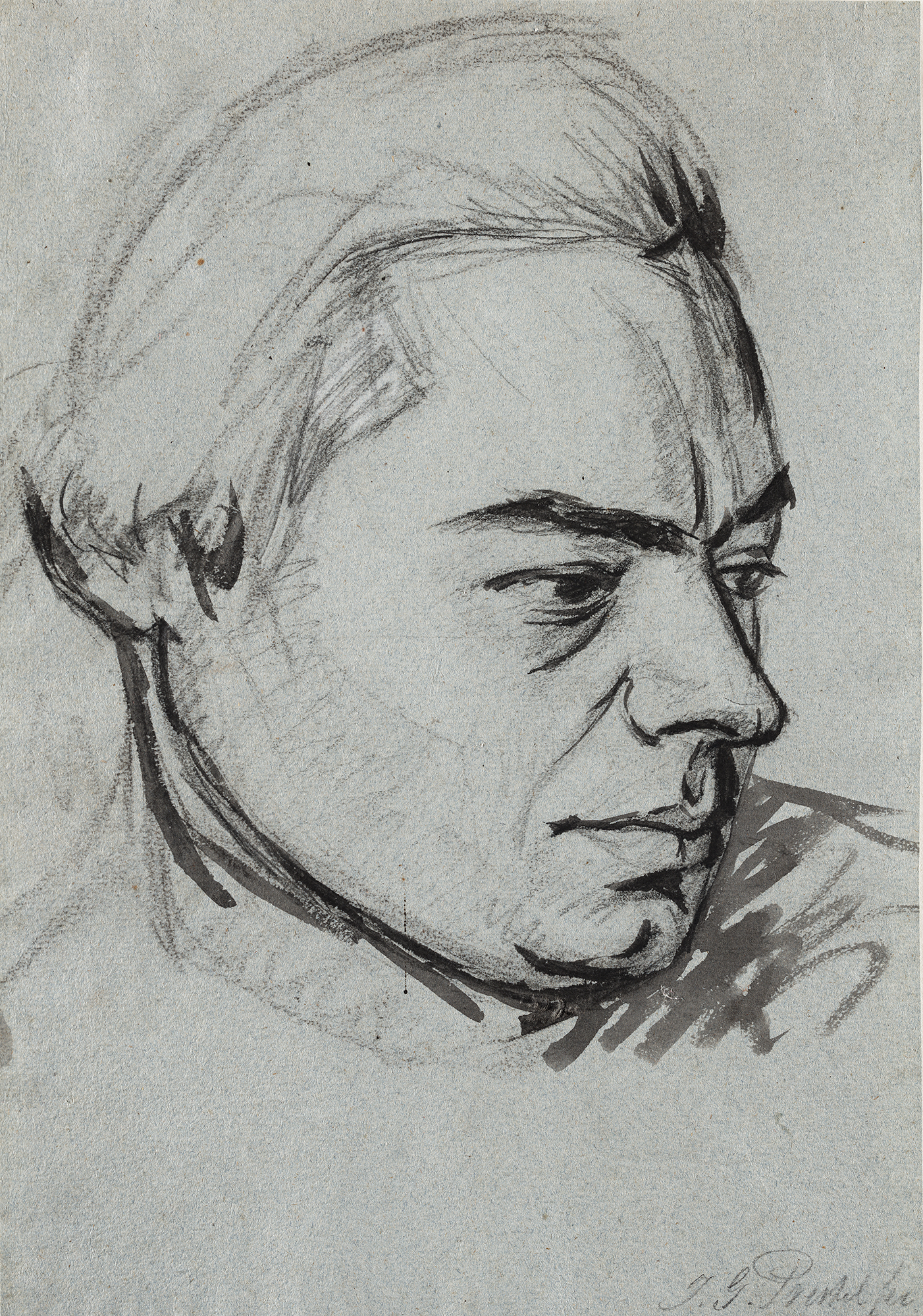
- Self-Portrait by Johann Gottlieb Prestel
- Born: Johann Gottlieb Prestel; 18 November 1739; Grönenbach, Princely Abbey of Kempten, Swabia
- Died: 5 October 1808 (aged 68); Frankfurt, Confederation of the Rhine
- Other names: Theophilus Amadeus; J.G. Prestel
- Occupations: Painter; Draftsman; Engraver
- Known for: Engraving; Painting; Printmaking
- Style: Stipple engraving
- Spouse: Maria Katharina Höll (m. 1772–1786)
- Relatives: Ursula Magdalena Reinheimer (daughter)

Johann Gottlieb Prestel or Johann Amadeus Prestel (18 November 1739 – 5 October 1808) was a German painter, draftsman, and engraver, who was considered a master of copperplate engraving.

== Early life and education ==
Johann Gottlieb Prestel was born 18 November 1739 in Grönenbach in the Princely Abbey of Kempten, Swabia (now part of Bavaria, Germany). He had a brother named Johann Gotthard Prestel, a carpenter and reverse glass painter.

Growing up in the Swabian village, Prestel and his brother initially learned carpentry from his father. The profession required him to frequently make coffins for the surrounding villages, which the two learned to paint as young boys. An epidemic delayed his decision to leave home. Prestel used the opportunity to earn money by continuing to paint coffins when others refused out of fear of infection.

Prestel relocated to Prague in 1757 but was detained during the Prussian siege. Respected for his skill, he nonetheless became disenchanted with guild restrictions. After returning home, he informed his parents of his choice to abandon carpentry for clockmaking. He began with a focus on creating wooden clocks, spending an entire year on a clock mechanism. Relatives bitterly reproached him for his decision, accusing him of avoiding work. During this time, he often sought comfort from a friend in Ottobeuren, a neighboring town. It was there, at the Ottobeuren Abbey which was being restored, that defined his artistic path. Watching painters create murals inspired him to sketch the ceiling paintings in the dome so skillfully that it astonished the masters. This encounter introduced him to Johann Jakob Zeiller and Franz Anton Zeiller from Reutte in Tyrol, Austria, who specialized in fresco painting. The Zeiller brothers took him under their wing, and supplied him with drawings and engravings to practice during the winter when they returned to Tyrol. When spring came, the painters, amazed by his growth, brought him into their workshop as an assistant and a model for older apprentices.

=== Venice ===
He later ended his apprenticeship to embark on a journey to Italy. Now in his early 20s, Prestel studied painting in Venice. He stayed in Italy from 1760 until 1766 and was acquainted with Giuseppe Nogari then Jacques Wagner. When he first arrived, he began to replicate an altarpiece that he discovered in a church when a man knelt nearby to pray then gestured him to follow as Prestel didn't speak Italian. Upon following the man, Prestel discovered that the stranger he was with was Giuseppe Nogari, who created the original altar painting he had copied. Admiring Prestel's ambition, Nogari housed him, taught him, and proposed making him heir by marrying his young heiress cousin. Prestel, however, rejected the offer, unwilling to settle in Venice and be bound by such a commitment early in his artistic journey. Nogari, feeling betrayed, accused him of ingratitude and chased him from his home.

=== Rome ===
Prestel sought the guidance of fellow German engraver and art dealer Joseph Wagner, who lived in Venice and taught him the art of copper engraving. Wagner had formed a school of copperplate engravers in Italy. Seizing an opportunity arranged by Wagner, Prestel traveled to Rome with a canon from Mainz Cathedral after living in Venice for two years. However, he stayed in Rome only briefly before making his way on foot to Naples. In Naples, he encountered the canon, who reprimanded him for his odd behavior but still invited him to continue traveling around Italy to make drawings for him. Prestel, however, refused and, a few days later, returned to Rome alone on foot.

The grandeur of Roman art left Prestel uncertain of his own talent. After briefly withdrawing to make paints and brushes, he was urged by a fellow countryman to resume painting, focusing on antiquity and the Roman masters. Prestel worked in the workshops of Pompeo Batoni and Giuseppe Bottani. He frequently faced shortages and often took refuge in Roman monasteries and abbeys, where he managed to sell some of his small paintings with their assistance. While in Rome, Prestel learned various techniques, from protecting frescoes to restoring paintings and improving plaster casting, but he never exploited these skills for personal gain.

=== Florence ===
In 1766, after spending four years in Rome, Prestel traveled to Florence, Tuscany, where he was met with a warm reception. Grand Duke Leopold II (brother of Joseph II) offered him a significant annual salary if he would become his court painter, but Prestel rejected the offer. He briefly visited Bologna before returning to Venice.

== Career ==
=== Nuremberg ===
Following a nine-year absence, he returned to his hometown in Germany in 1769 for a short stay before relocating to Augsburg. He quickly moved again to Nuremberg, where he became active as a portrait painter. In Nuremberg, Prestel debuted in an unconventional way by painting the portrait of a famous street figure at his inn and exhibiting it publicly. The portrait was well-received, leading to numerous commissions. In addition to creating works in oil and pastel, he gave painting and drawing lessons.

Among his students was Maria Katharina Höll. Maria Katharina, his pupil and associate, became his wife in 1772 in Nuremberg. They had four children: Christian Erdmann Gottlieb, Johann Adam, Michael Gottlieb, and Ursula Magdalena Reinheimer, who all followed artistic paths. His first son, Christian, arrived on 12 August 1773, with Adam, his second, following on 25 January 1775.

In 1772, he copied a large painting of Emperor Matthias after Johann Georg Kreutzfelder. It portrayed the emperor granting the Bohemian fiefdom to the city magistrate in the presence of many bishops and princes.

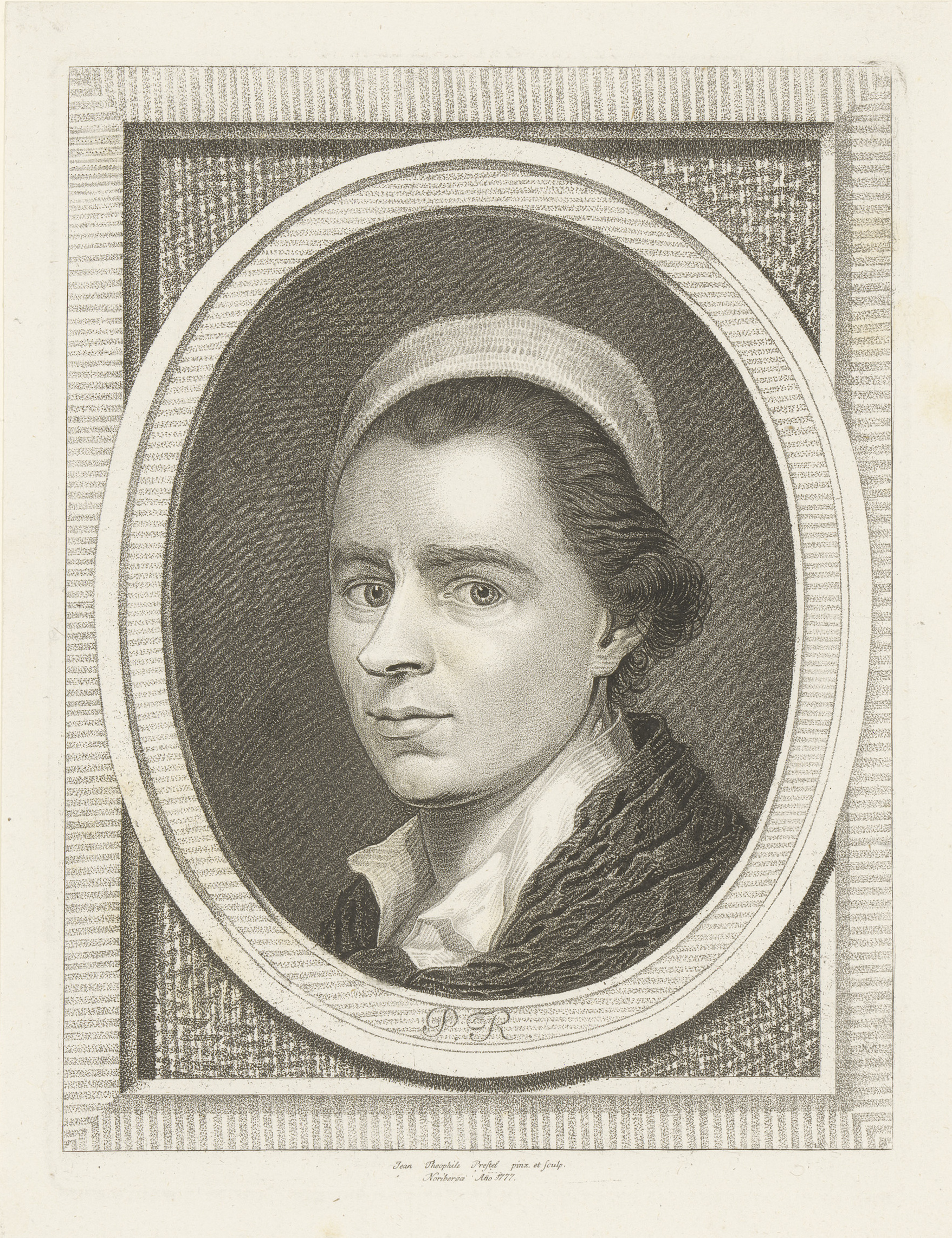
Self portrait by Johann Gottlieb Prestel

German writer Michael Huber wrote that Prestel went to Switzerland for roughly six months in 1775, spending much of his time with Johann Kaspar Lavater in Zurich, during which Lavater's influence made him a sought-after portrait painter. His first work was a self-portrait, painted in the grand Italian style in Schaffhausen. He notably painted a portrait of Goethe at Lavater's house.

After returning from Switzerland, he turned from painting and advanced to copper engraving, first mastering etching and then focusing on stipple engraving and aquatint methods. Prestel experimented with the burin and inking, starting with outlines before progressing to red pencil and ink styles. Finding his shadowless contour style unpopular, Prestel transitioned to a broader approach, excelling in etching, pencil, and wash methods. He sought to merge the brush's mildness with the drawing's precision in copperplate printing, eventually leading to his invention of the Prestelian manner, the techniques of which he kept secret.

Prestel soon shifted his focus to mainly reproducing master drawings using aquatint, a technique recently invented by French painter Jean-Baptiste Le Prince.

Maria Katharina, his wife, trained under Prestel, and the couple collaborated on various prints in etching, aquatint, and in the crayon manner (known as Stipple engraving). Using aquatint, he reproduced drawings from the collection of Paul von Praun, a well-known collector of old master drawings, in 1776. One of these includes The Sleeping Child (1519) which was reproduced in engraving. More than 600 sheets are reported to have come from his workshop, in which his children were also participants. His daughter Ursula Magdalena was born on 27 November 1777. Prestel's third son, Michael Gottlieb was born on 12 July 1779.

The Düsseldorf Academy appointed Johann Gottlieb Prestel as an honorary member in 1779, and a year later, Charles Theodore, Elector of Bavaria sent him a letter of appreciation for his work on the Praun Cabinet. While still finishing the Praun Cabinet, Prestel announced reproductions of 30 sheets from Gérard Joachim Schmidt's collection in Hamburg, published in 1779. In 1780, his work on the Praun Cabinet consisting of 48 sheets was published. By 1781, another Small Cabinet volume was announced, combining works from the Praun and Schmidt Cabinets and other collections. At the same time, he planned to exhibit 24 paintings by Adrian van der Werff in the Düsseldorf Gallery. In 1782, 36 sheets of the Small Cabinet were published. Many were so skillfully imitated that even connoisseurs mistook them for originals. Despite their high price, Prestel's works were highly sought after and featured in important collections, though his expenses for plates and presses were significant.

=== Frankfurt ===
Between 1782 and 1783, financial difficulties drove him to leave Nuremberg with his family, moving to Frankfurt by 1783 as his wife sought new prospects.

His wife Maria Katharina separated from him in 1786, moving with their children to London, England where she had a successful career as a printmaker. After his wife's departure, Prestel's productivity declined, affected by personal turmoil and the political unrest of the French Revolution in the late 1780s.

During his stay in Frankfurt in 1794, Prestel taught German landscape painter Anton Radl from Vienna copperplate engraving, etching and gouache painting. He was also joined by Johann Georg Reinheimer from Frankfurt and his daughter Ursula Magdalena who returned to her father in Frankfurt after her mother's death in 1794. Prestel's publishing house produced many large sheets, printed in brown or multiple colors, both individually and in collections. His skilled assistants were not permitted to sign the works. It is said that the artist's focus on excessive production and lack of careful subject selection led him to be seen as more of a businessman than an artist.

Prestel's key work during this period involved reproducing artworks from Count Friedrich Moritz von Brabeck's gallery in Söder, a collection he had been familiar with due to the count's notable paintings. In 1798, Prestel, accompanied by his daughter and Radl, visited Brabeck to sketch all the gallery's landscape paintings for copperplate engraving.

Prestel later became affiliated with the newly created museum society in Frankfurt and began mentoring a student again, Schulz from Weilburg. At this time, he found inspiration to take on independent projects, such as painting an altarpiece for St. Leonard's Church and a historical painting for Karl Theodor Anton Maria von Dalberg, but died before finishing them.

== Death ==
After suffering a stroke, Johann Gottlieb Prestel died on 5 October 1808 in Frankfurt, Germany.

When Prestel died at the age of 69, Karl Ritter, a prominent Berlin scholar and a young man residing in Frankfurt, gave a respectful eulogy in the newly built museum.

== Works ==
=== Individual works ===
- Jean Théophile Prestel Seated at His Easel (Painted by himself, engraved in dotted etching)
- Holy Family (Etching after Alb. Dürer, 1519)
- Descent from the Cross (Engraved in chiaroscuro after a drawing by Raphael)
- A Mother of Sorrow (Virgin with the Body of Jesus) (After Van Dyck, engraved in pencil style)
- A Woman in a Forest (St. Therese) (Engraved in wash style after F. X. Wiser)
- St. Peter Consecrating the Deacon of St. Stephen as a Priest (Engraved in colorful style after an Italian master)

=== Collaborative works ===
- View of the Strahlenberger Hof (After Ch. G. Schutz, 1784)
- The Bridge (After a landscape by Dietrich)
- Landscapes with Cattle (Morning) (After Henri Roos)
- Four Views of Heidelberg Castle (Published by Schlicht in Mannheim)
- Tempio del Pace (After Du Cros)
- Ruins of the Temple of the Sun in Palmira (Traced and engraved after Moretti)
- The Great Roman Bath in Apulia (Traced and engraved after Moretti)
- The Adulterous Woman (After Pietro da Cortona)
- Landscapes with a Large Rock (After Wagner)
- The South View of a Forest with Sheepfolds (Traced and engraved from the Count of Stadion's Cabinet, Mainz)
- Le Soir (Mountainous Landscape) (Traced and engraved)
- View of the Rhine near Basel (After Fr. Schütz)
- View of Untersee in the Canton of Bern (After Fr. Schütz)
- Large Mountainous Landscape with a Waterfall (Painted by Ald. van Everdingen)
- Ruinen des Poseidontempels in Paestum (after Alessandro Moretti)

=== Collections ===
- Drawings from the Cabinet of Paul Braun (Nuremberg). (Published in 1780); Large folio (48 sheets).
- Drawings from the Cabinet of Gérard Joachim Schmidt (Hamburg).(Published in 1779); Large folio (30 sheets) including works from other cabinets, such as the Prince of Ligne in Brussels.
- Drawings from Various Famous Cabinets (Published in 1782)

== Gallery ==
Prints by Johann Gottlieb Prestel

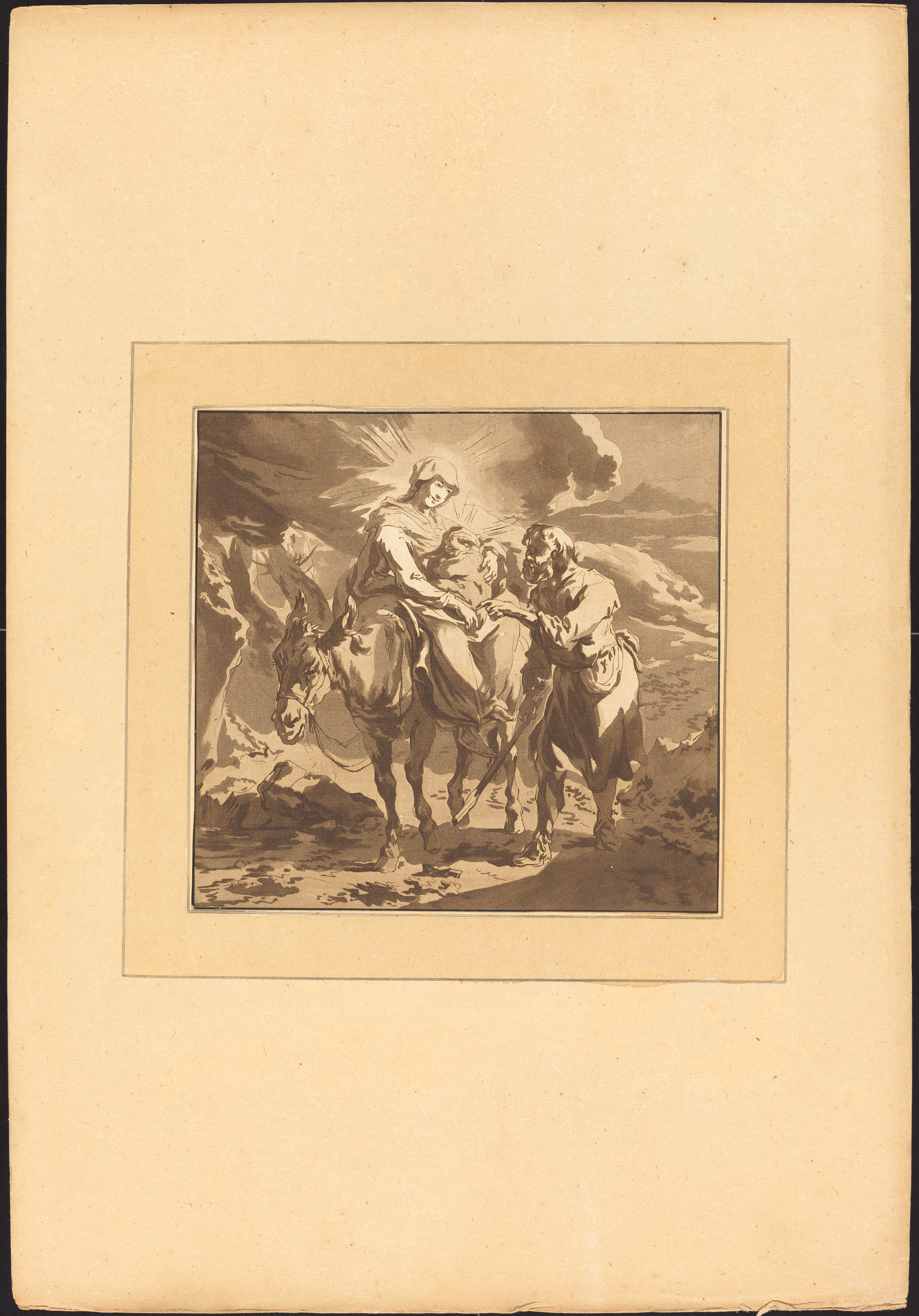
The Flight into Egypt (after Nicolaes Pietersz Berchem)

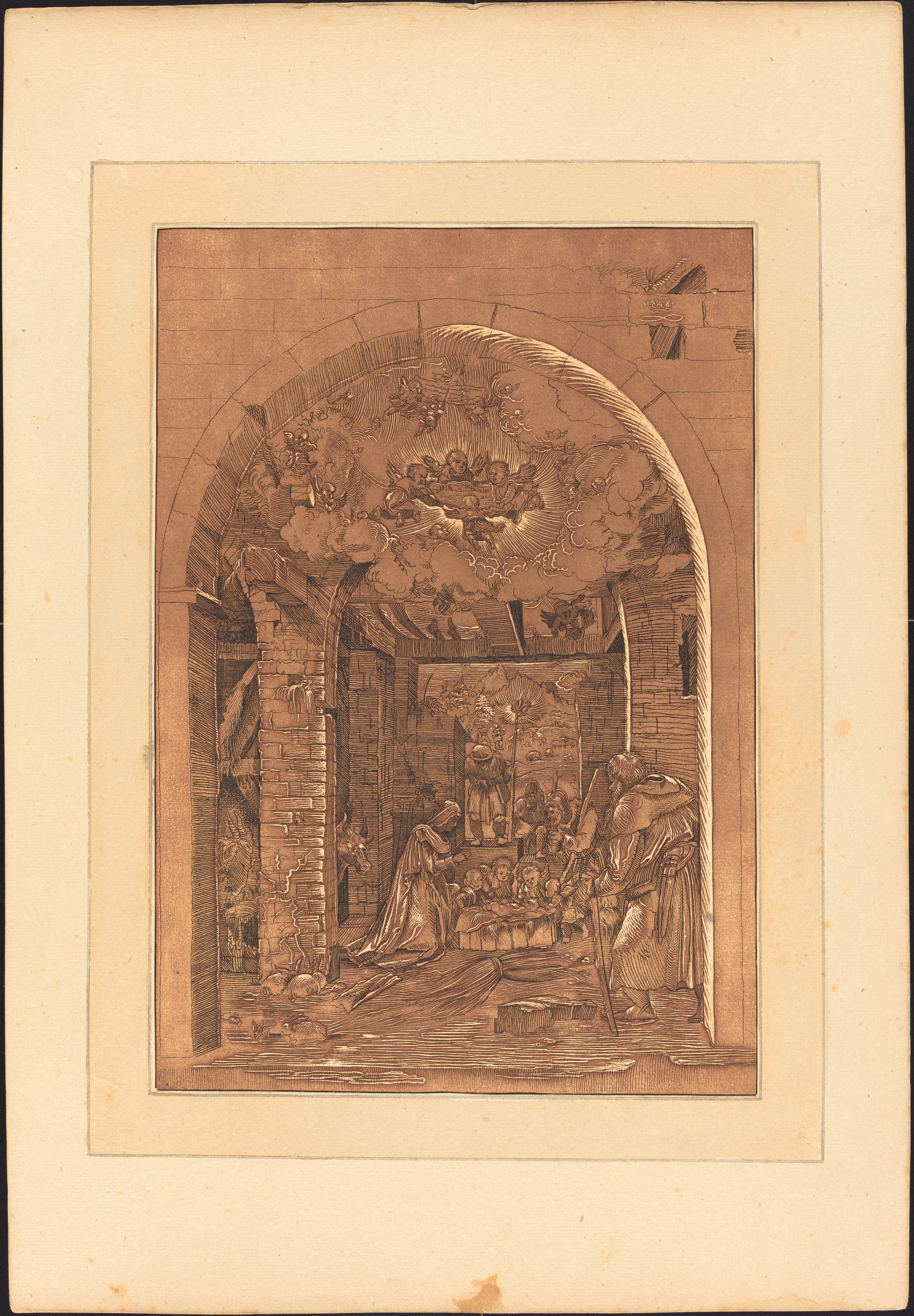
The Adoration of the Shepherds

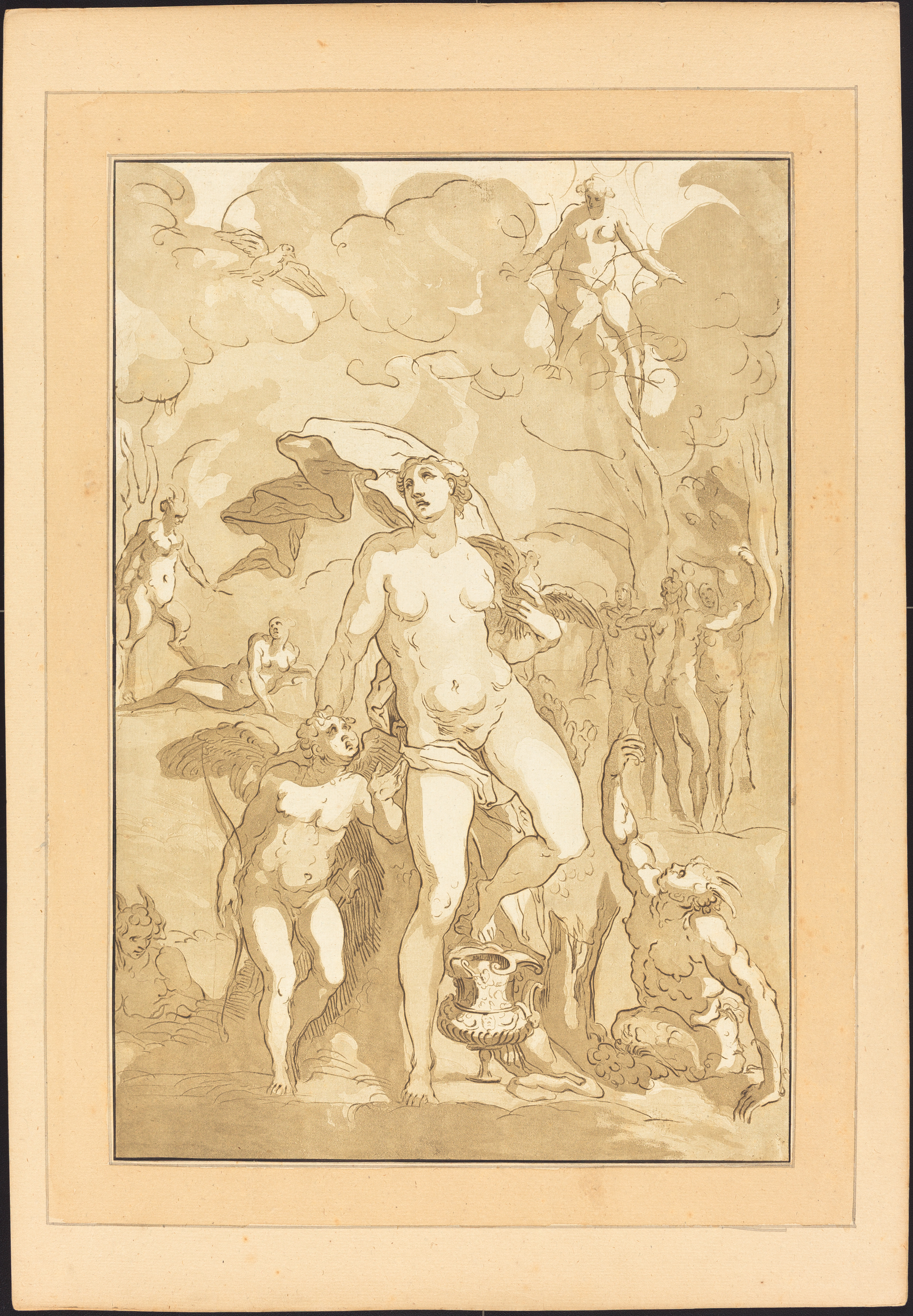
Venus (after Jacopo Ligozzi)

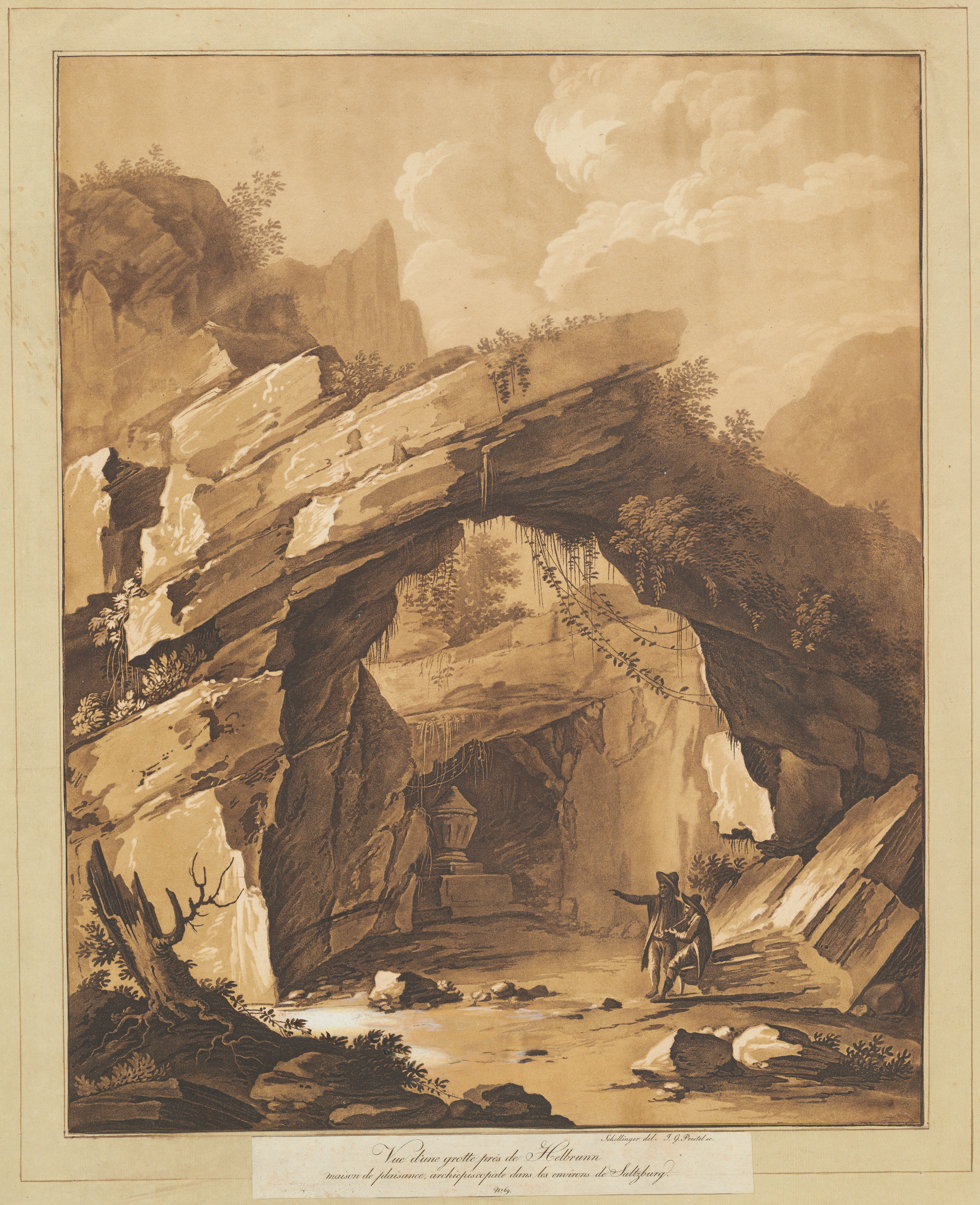
View of the Grotto by Hellbrunn, near Salzburg (after Schellinger)

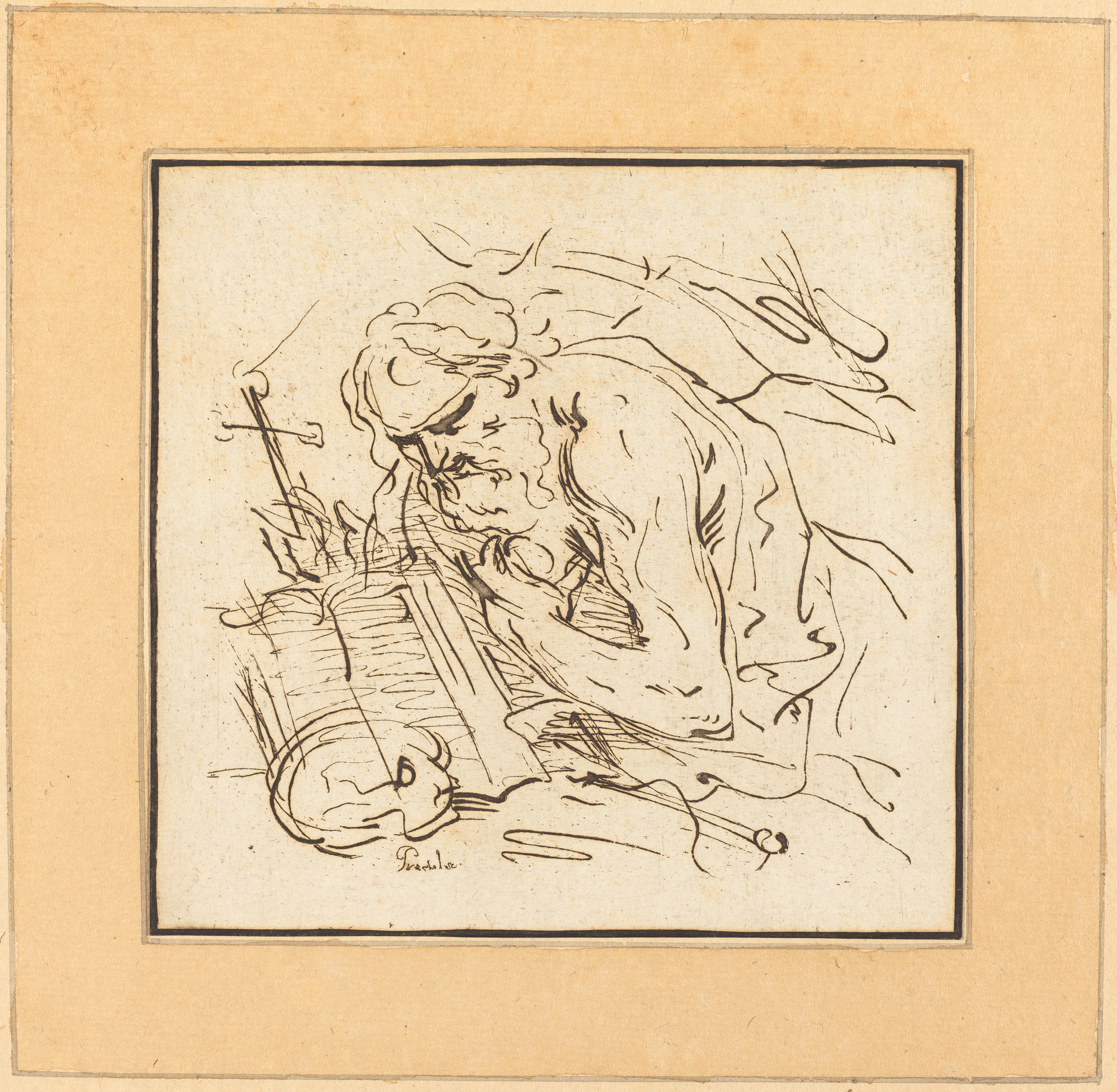
Saint Jerome (after Domenichino)

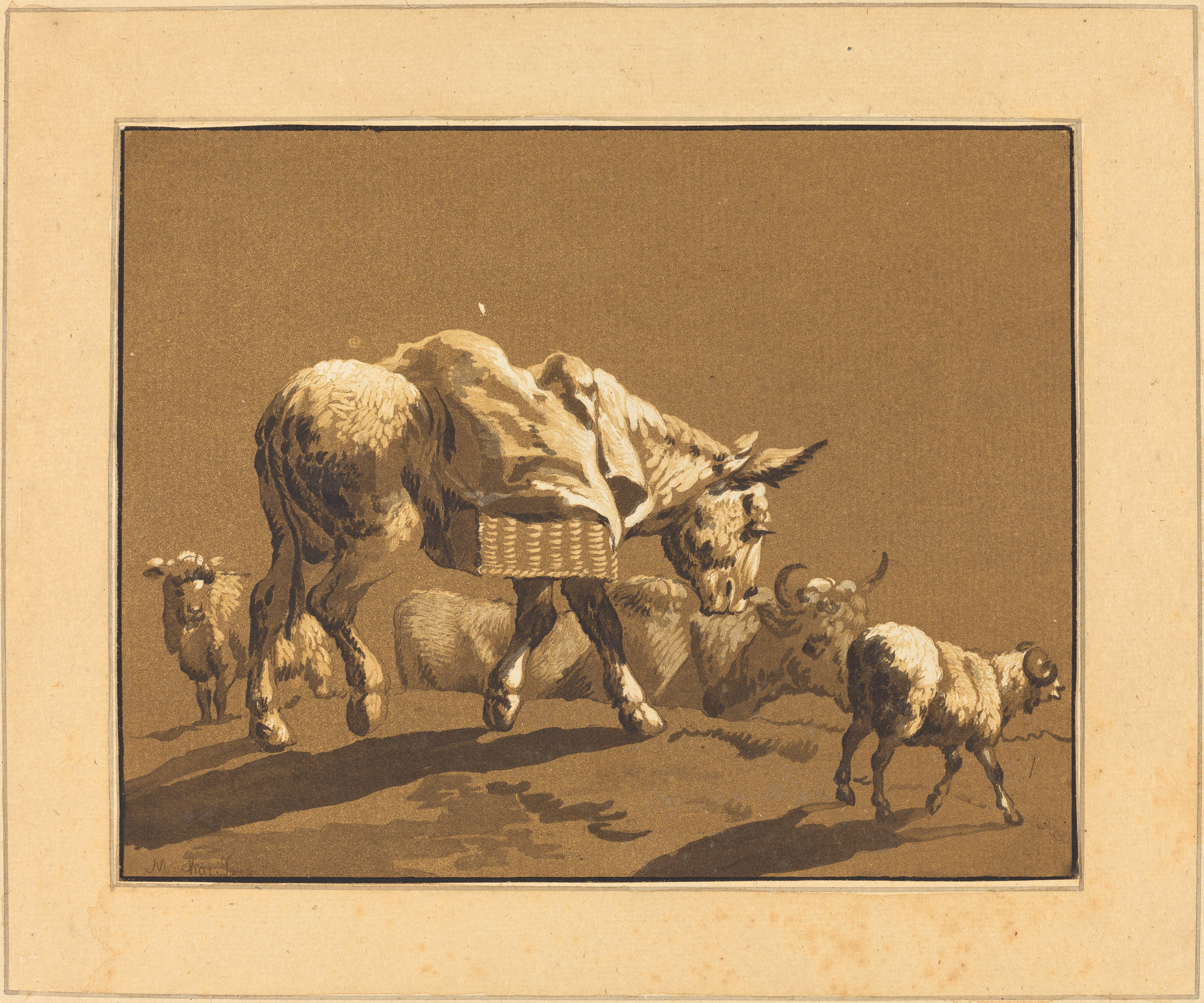
Donkey (after Joseph Wagner)

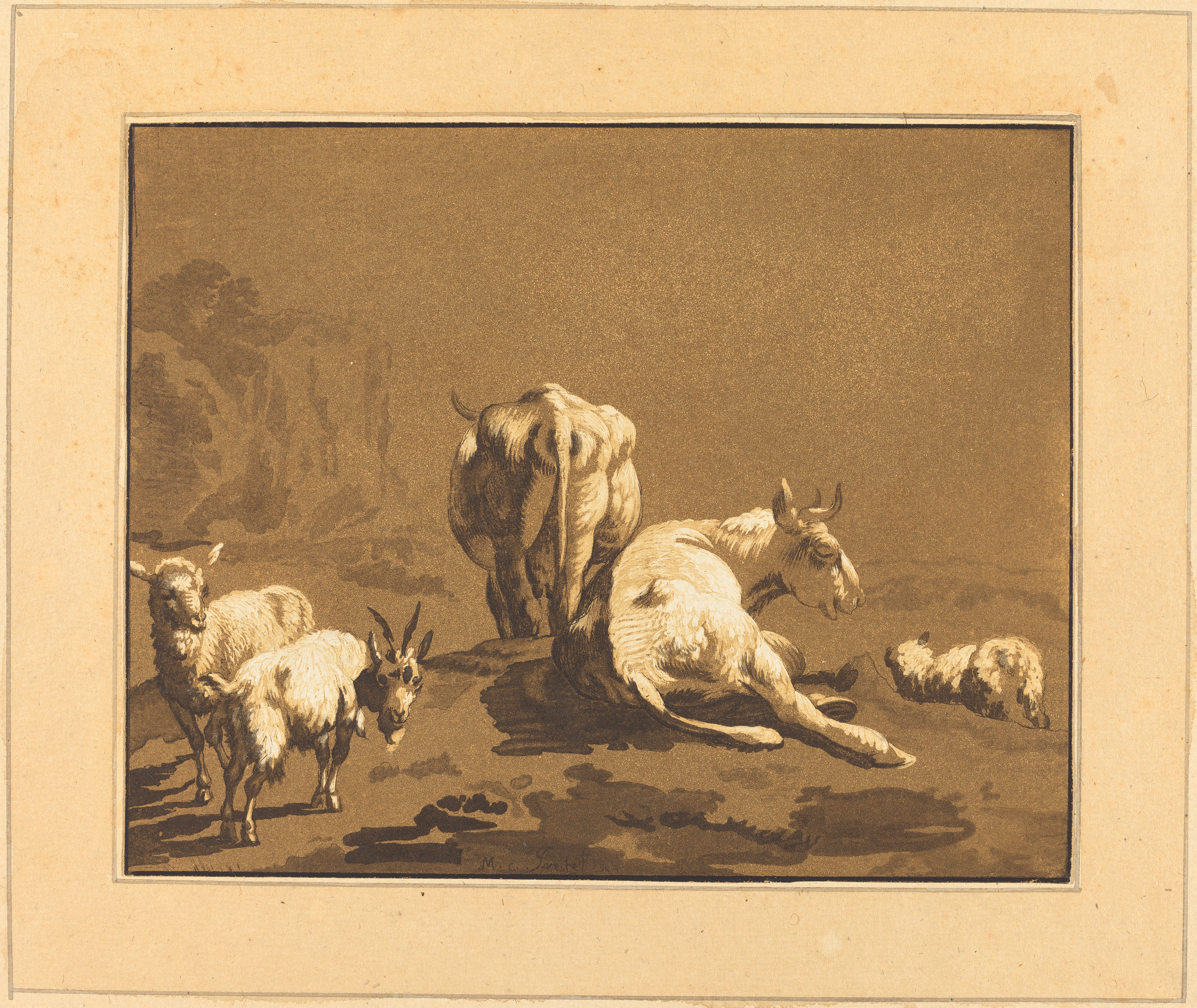
Cows (after Joseph Wagner)

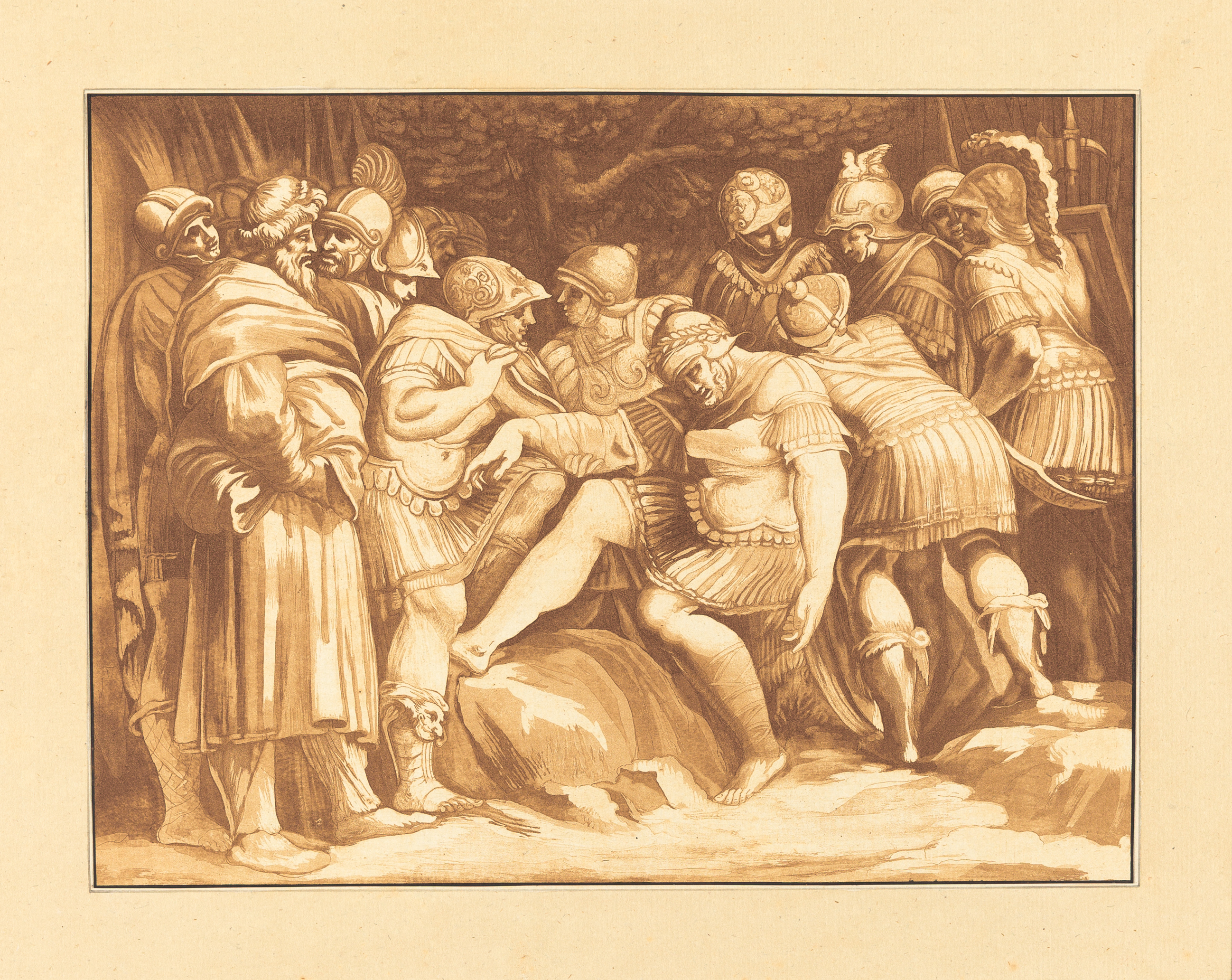
Dying Epaminondas (after Polidoro da Caravaggio)
