= Anton Radl =

Austrian painter and engraver (1774-1852)

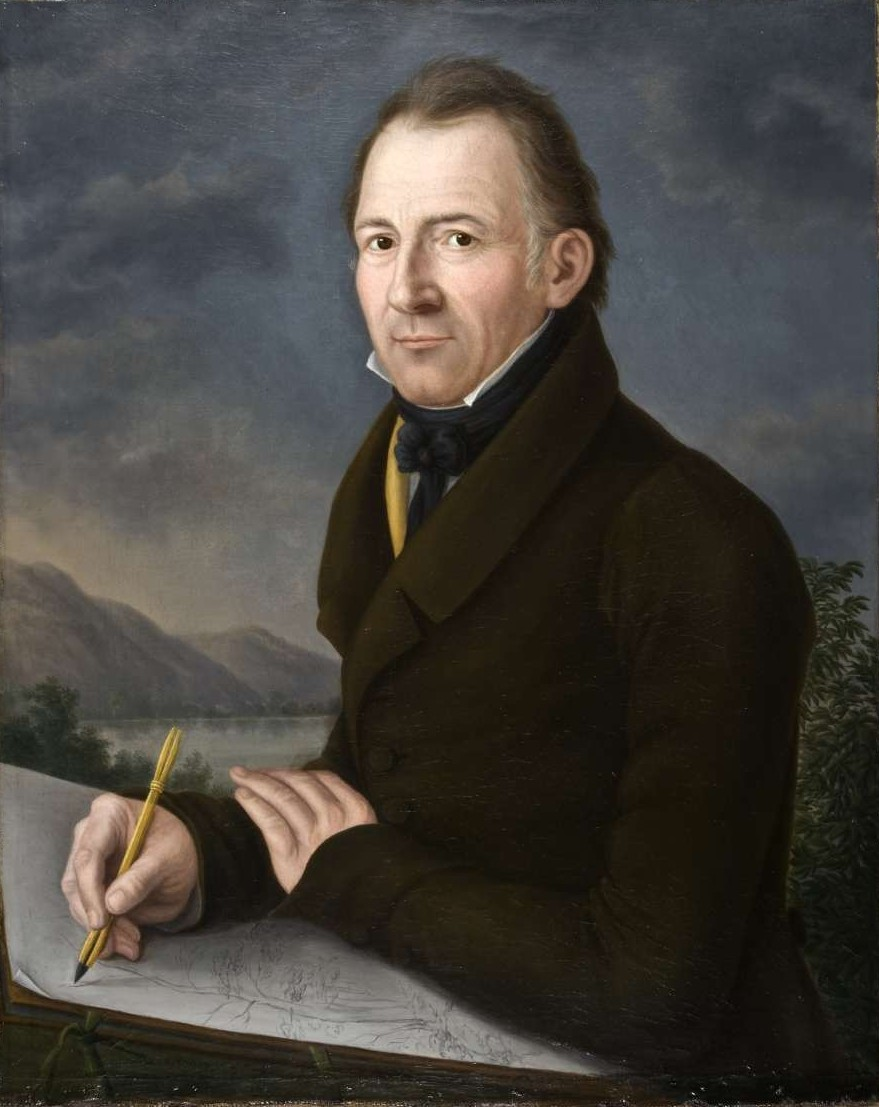
- Portrait of Anton Radl by Ursula Magdalena Reinheimer, Frankfurt Historical Museum, c. 1830
- Born: 15 April 1774; Vienna, Archduchy of Austria
- Died: 4 March 1852 (aged 77); Frankfurt, Hesse, Germany
- Occupations: Landscape painter; Engraver; Commercial artist
- Known for: Engraving; Painting
- Spouse: Rofina Hochschlig

Anton Radl (15 April 1774 – 4 March 1852) was an Austrian landscape painter and engraver.

== Early life and education ==
Anton Radl was born on 15 April 1774 in Vienna in the Archduchy of Austria, within the Habsburg Monarchy.

As the youngest of four, Anton lost his father, a hard-working painter, during childhood, leaving him solely under his mother's care. His two older brothers joined the Austro-Turkish War but succumbed to epidemics in the region near Belgrade due to poor living conditions.

His basic education at the city school was complemented by his mother's influence, which shaped his virtues and appreciation for his father's artistic work. Visiting the Belvedere Palace's picture gallery weekly with his mother fostered his creativity, motivating him to experiment with pen and pencil at home. Through his mother's requests and the intercession of some friends, he soon gained admission to the Academy of Vienna. To avoid burdening his mother, he committed to interior painting work throughout the week, enabling him to visit the academy twice weekly.

As conscription spread in Vienna during preparations against the 1789 French Revolution, his mother, who had lost two sons to war, helped Anton avoid the draft by fleeing. The youth crossed the Bavarian border unchallenged, journeyed through several states to Brabant, met his father's old friend who gave him artistic training, and then continued to Brussels in 1790.

== Career ==
After leaving his studies at the Academy of Vienna to avoid military service, he found work with the painter Kormer in the City of Brussels. Forced to flee in 1793, Anton left Belgium's capital, where he had lived for only a year, as French forces occupied the region. He traveled to Aachen, then to Cologne in the freezing winter of 1793–1794, and eventually reached Frankfurt on New Year's Day, with no resources, acquaintances, or recommendations.

Upon his arrival in Frankfurt on 1 January 1794, he was adopted by Johann Gottlieb Prestel's family. Prestel, deeply impressed by the wandering man's amiable and modest character, took him into his household, treating him as his own child. Radl was trained by Prestel in copperplate engraving, etching and gouache painting. He worked for Prestel's Frankfurt publishing house and became his chief assistant. Radl contributed a great share in the engravings by Prestel after Dutch painter Salomon van Ruysdael. In 1798, Radl accompanied Prestel and his daughter Ursula Magdalena Reinheimer (née Prestel) and visited Count Friedrich Moritz von Brabeck's gallery in Söder to sketch all the gallery's landscape paintings for copperplate engraving. Under Prestel's guidance and through diligent study of old paintings and nature, he quickly rose to become a master of the Middle Rhine, gaining independence in his profession.

In 1801, he married Rofina Hochschlig, but their marriage was marked by the loss of all seven children born to them.

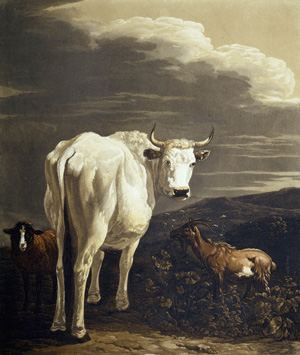
Boeuf blanc by Anton Radl, 1806.

Focused on the scenic beauty of the Frankfurt area, Radl's landscapes reflected the style of 18th-century artists such as Christian Georg Schütz and Johann Andreas Benjamin Nothnagel. Among his works were depictions of the most significant castles in the Main region, a series of outstanding paintings that later became part of the collection of the Grand Duke of Weimar. He produced an engraving of The White Bull (French: Le Boeuf blanc) in 1806, after Paulus Potter's painting. The Forest in the Sunshine, regarded as one of his largest and finest works, was completed in 1807 and resides at the Darmstadt Gallery.

Anton Radl visited the Danube region in 1816, contributing drawings for Friedrich Wilmans bookshop's engravings of the German Confederation's free cities and scenes from northern Germany. Over 75 German landscapes were completed by him in sepia and Indian ink.

Radl returned to Frankfurt in 1818. In 1819, he completed a chalk drawing of Austrian dancer Marianne von Willemer.

The Frankfurt Artists' Festival was held in honour of Anton Radl. On 17 December 1843, in one of the evening art exhibitions held in the Städel Art Institute, several paintings by the landscape painter were displayed for the public.

== Death ==
Anton Radl died on 4 March 1852 in Frankfurt, Germany.

== Works ==
- The Gate of St. Gall in Frankfurt
- Bowling Alley
- Scenery at the Cow Trough
- Landscape
- Danube Region
- Woodland Scene
- Landscape with Herd
- Landscape with Mill
- View of Hardenberg Castle
- Ruins of the Chateau de Freudenburg
- View of the Chateau de Roedelheim
- The Dead Christ (Le Christ mort) (after Correggio)
- The White Bull (Le Boeuf blanc) (after Paulus Potter) (1806)
- A view from nature, taken from a part of the Rhine (painted in Gouache)
- A View of Regensburg
- The Forest in the Sunshine (or Woods in Sunshine) (1807)
- Entrance to Forest (1807)
- Forest Landscape
- The Epstein Valley in the Taunus (1815)
- View of the Ruins of Falkenstein in the Taunus (1817)
- Marianne von Willemer (1819)
- View of Kronberg in the Taunus (1823)
- View of Falkenstein and Königstein in the Taunus (1825)

=== Aquatints ===
- A Moonlight Scene (after Aert van der Neer)
- A Cornfield (after Ruysdael)
- A Cattle Scene (after Paulus Potter)
- A Bear Hunt (after Frans Snyders)

== Gallery ==
Selected works by Anton Radl

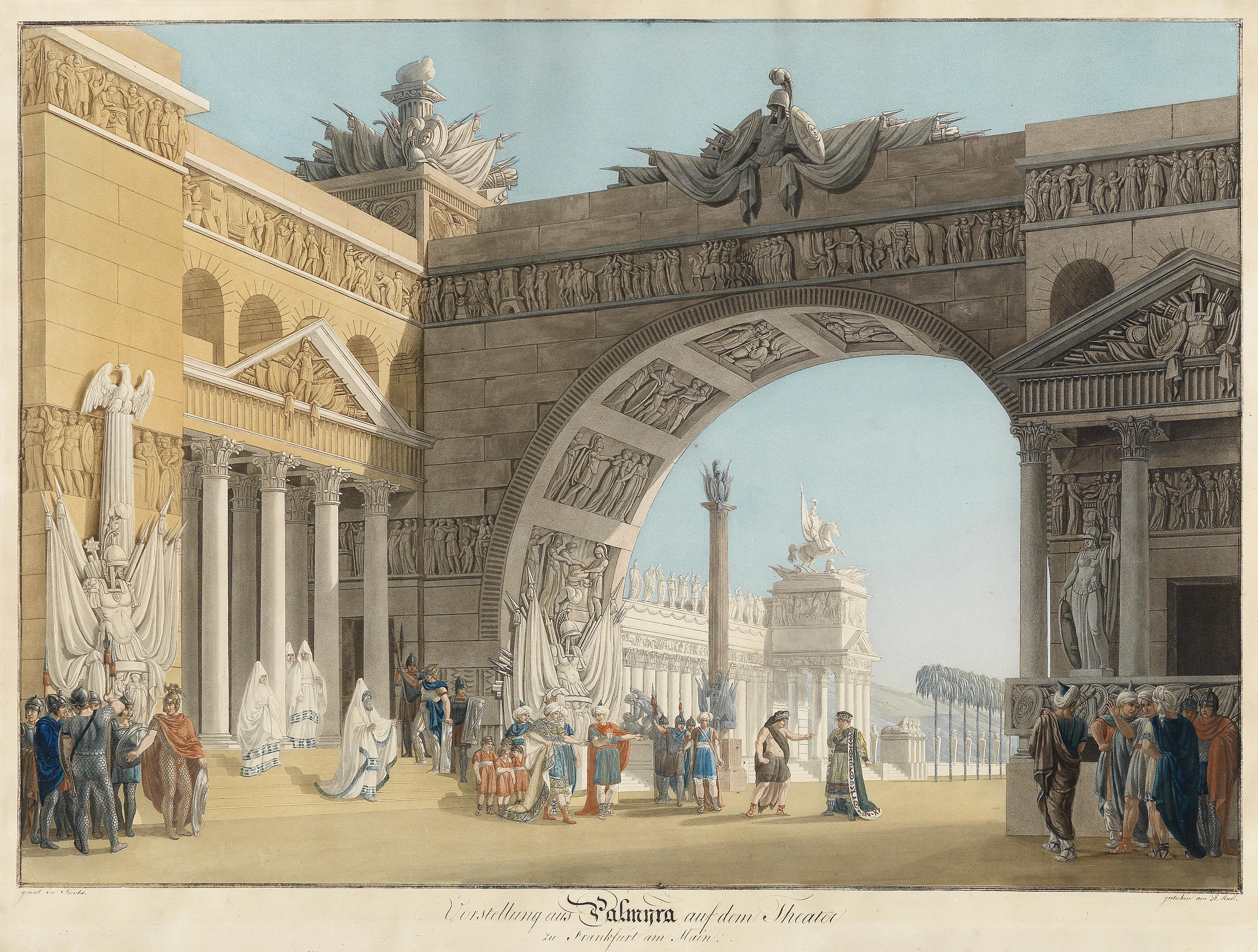

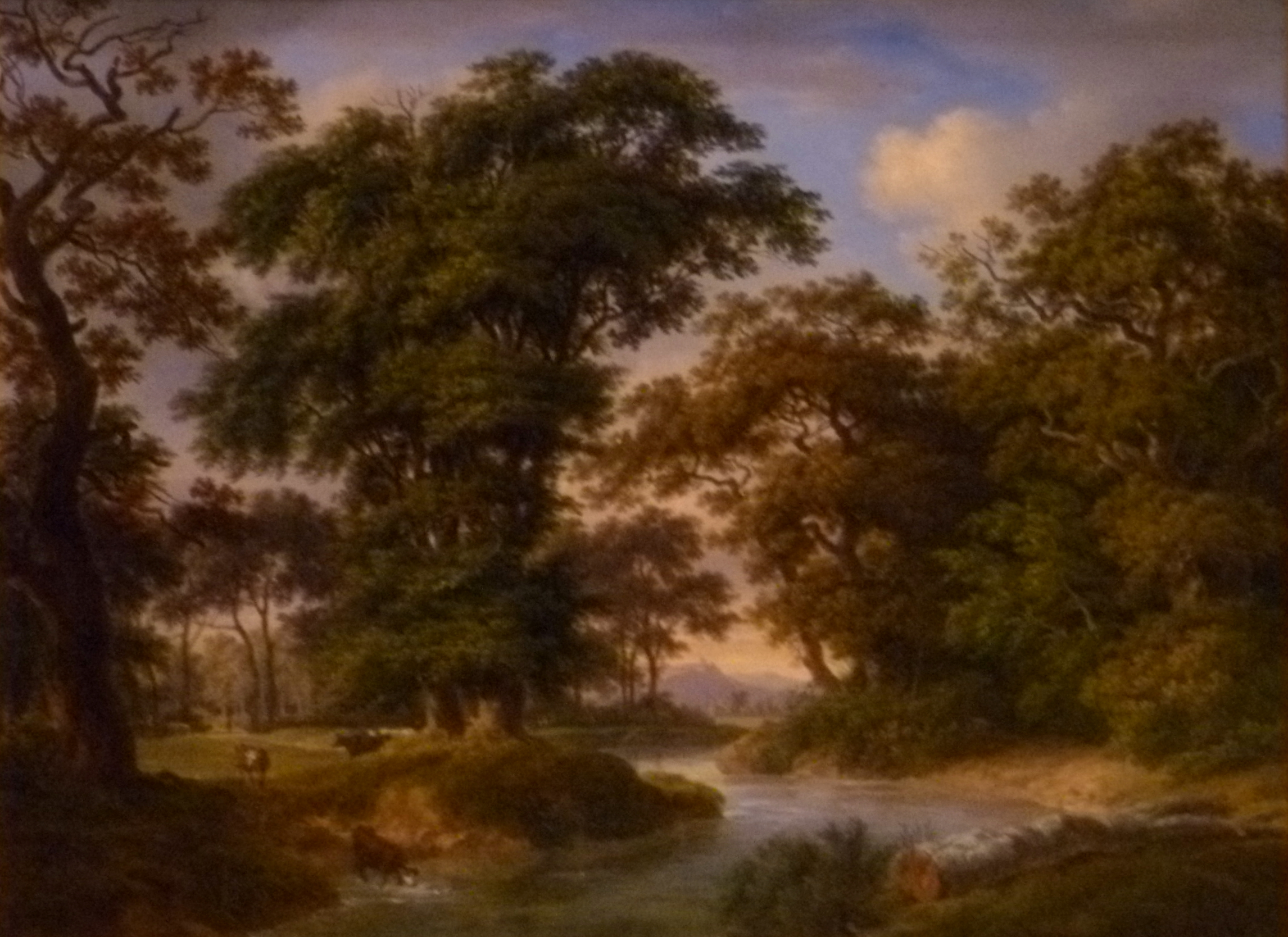

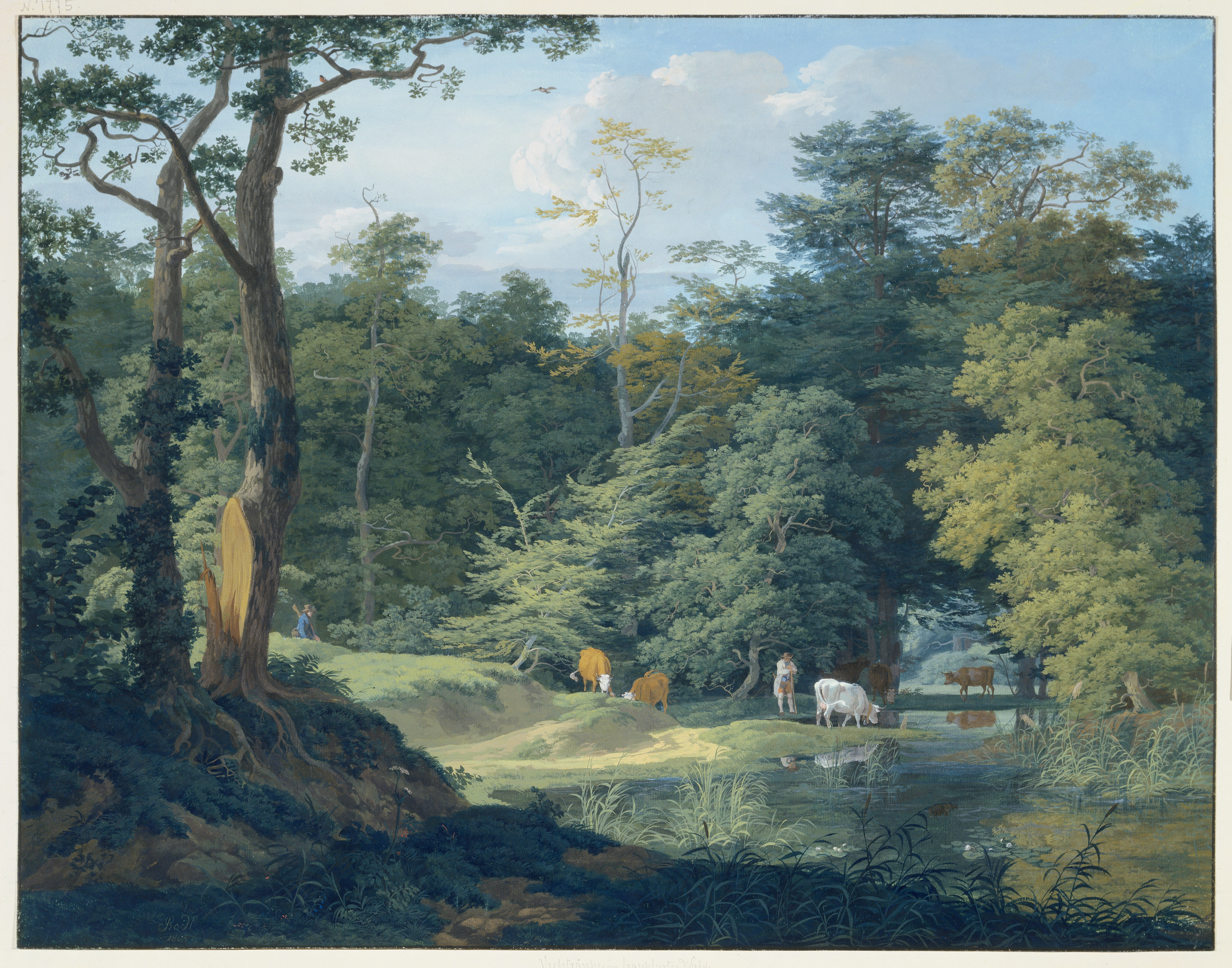

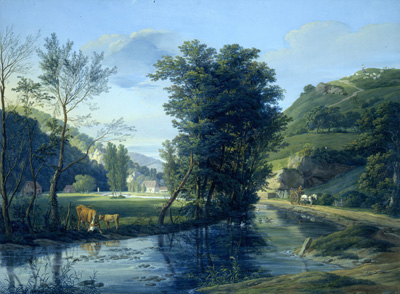

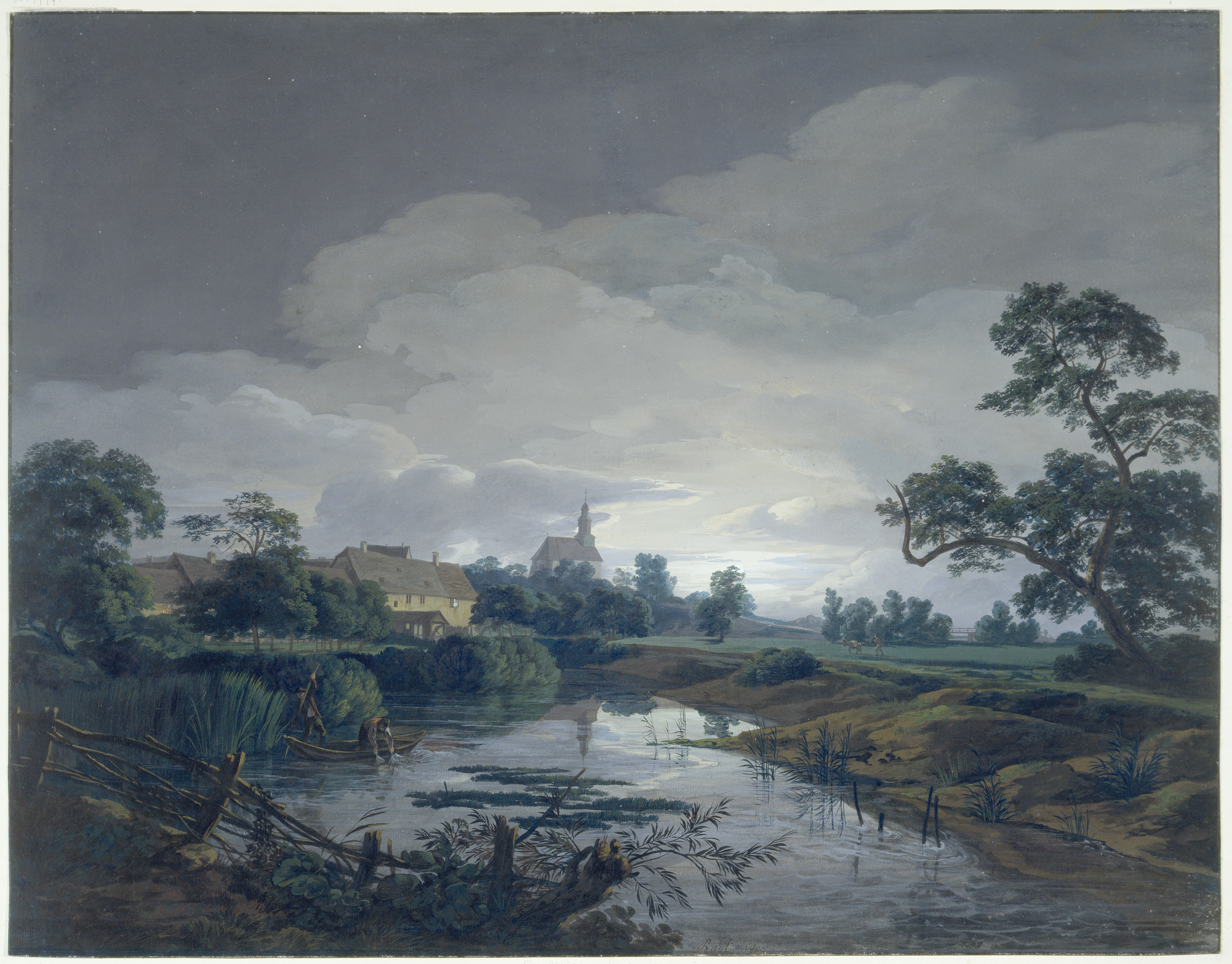

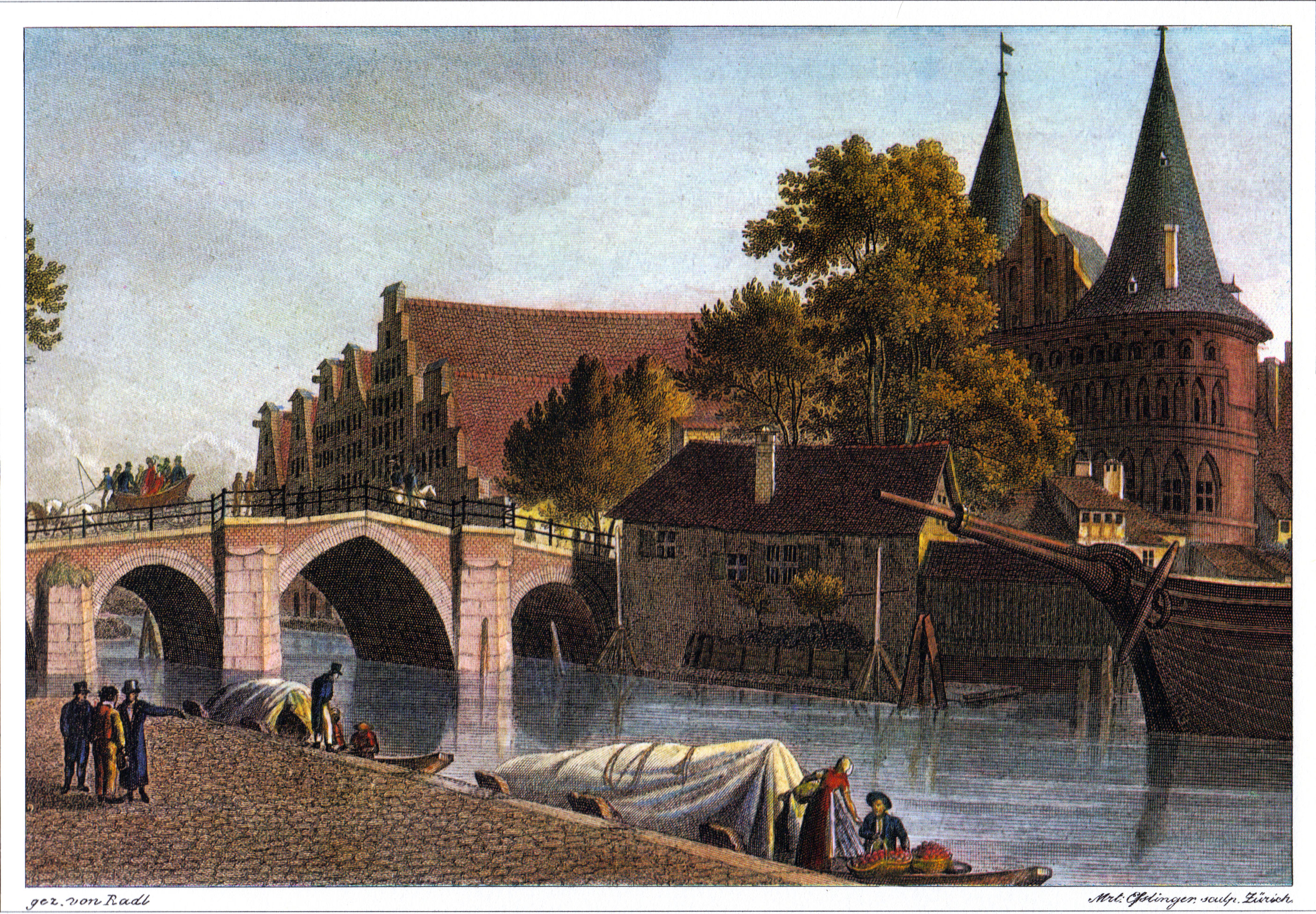

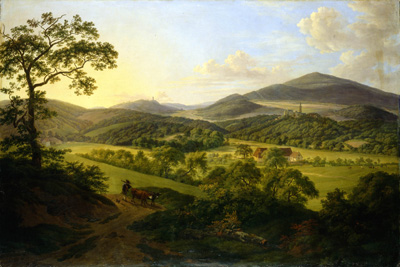

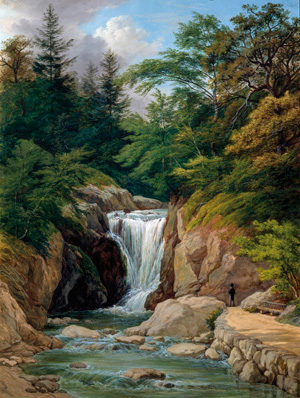

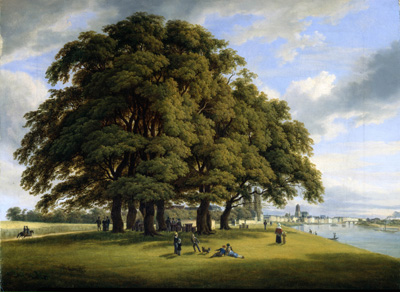

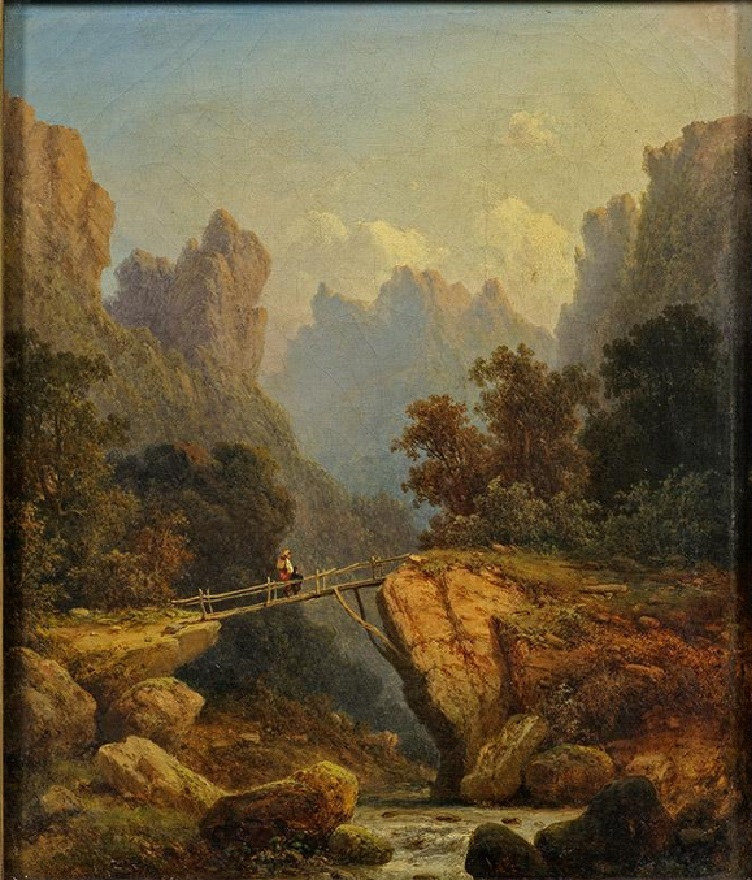

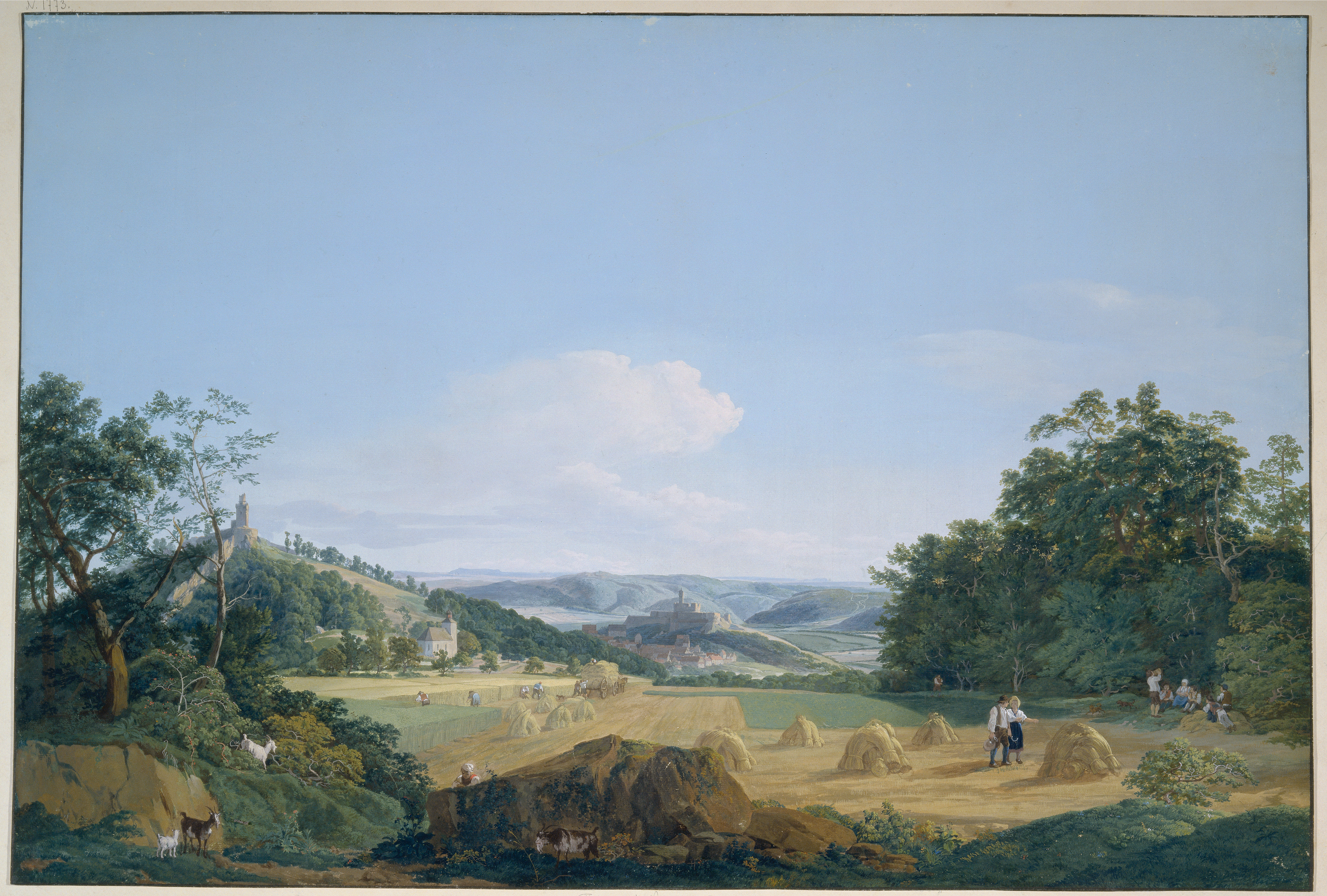
