= Jean-Baptiste Le Prince =

French painter (1734–1781)

Jean-Baptiste Prince
- Born: 17 September 1734; Metz, France
- Died: 30 September 1781 (aged 47); Saint-Denis-du-Port, France

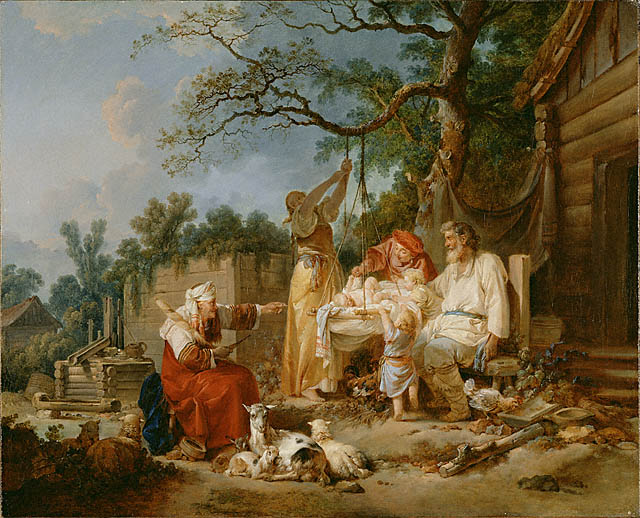
Jean-Baptiste Le Prince, The Russian Cradle, oil on canvas, c. 1764–1765, 23 1/4 × 29 in. J. Paul Getty Museum, Los Angeles, California

Jean-Baptiste Nicolas Le Prince (September 17, 1734 – September 30, 1781) was an important French etcher and painter. Le Prince first studied painting techniques in his native Metz. He then travelled to Paris around 1750 after being sponsored by Charles Louis Auguste Fouquet de Belle-Isle and became a leading student of the great painter, François Boucher. Le Prince's early paintings in both theme and style are comparable to his master's rococo techniques. He was the half-brother of French author Jeanne-Marie Leprince de Beaumont.

In 1758, Le Prince journeyed to Russia to work for Catherine the Great at the Imperial Palace, St. Petersburg, under Francesco Bartolomeo Rastrelli. He remained in Russia for five years and also travelled extensively throughout Finland, Lithuania, and even Siberia. When Le Prince returned to Paris in December 1763, he brought with him an extensive collection of drawings which he employed as the basis for a number of fine paintings and etchings. J. B. Le Prince was elected a full member of the Académie de peinture et de sculpture in 1765.

Le Prince's graphic art of Russia and its peoples is significant in that he based his compositions entirely upon his own designs, lending a much more realistic portrayal to his views than other eighteenth century contemporaries. He is also credited with being the first artist (in 1768) to introduce aquatint into his etched and engraved plates. He may even have been the inventor of aquatint, the tonal graphic art that would later be so skillfully used by such masters as Goya, Louis-Philibert Debucourt, Delacroix and Thomas Rowlandson.

== Sources ==
- "Лепренс, Жан" . Brockhaus and Efron Encyclopedic Dictionary (in Russian). 1906.
