= Johann Andreas Benjamin Nothnagel =

German painter

Johann Andreas Benjamin Nothnagel (1729–1804) was a German Jewish painter who painted famous paintings of Jewish rabbis and leaders. A portrait of an artist, thought to be his self portrait, is found in the Nagler Exhibition.

Some of this artist's paintings have become identified with famous rabbis from decades before his time, for which he drew imaginary portraits. Copies and sketches of his pictures and etchings have been attributed to the images of various rabbis, sometimes the same image serving for two different people. They have been printed in Jewish history books, and in the past 100 years or so have become part of the Sukkah ornaments, with the writing of Isaiah's prophecy (30:20) '...and your eyes shall see those who show you the way'.

Some of his art was stolen by Nazi Germany. The Israel Museum exhibits one such picture, retrieved from the Nazi plunder, but which the details of are now obscure.

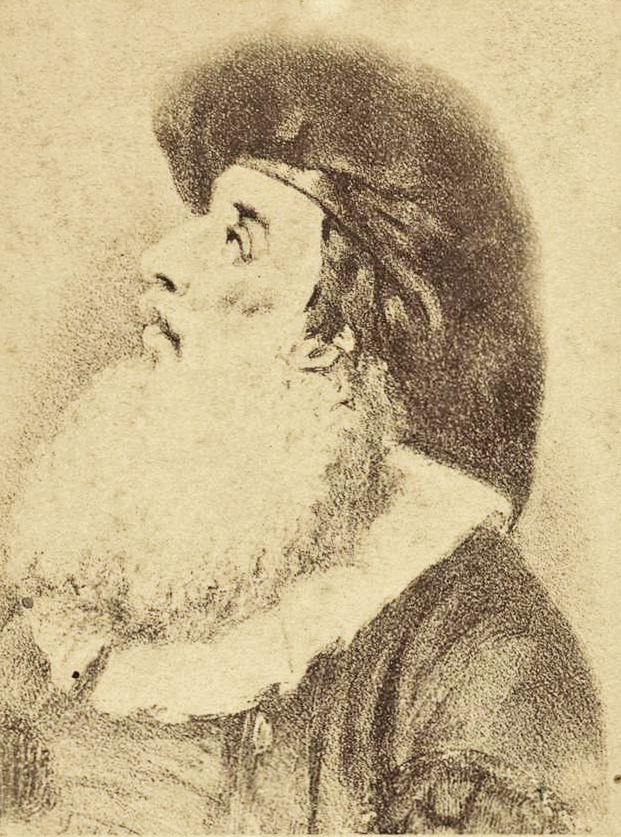
Naphtali Cohen

Another, of Rabbi Naphtali Katz (Cohen Zedek) is shown at the Jewish Museum in Frankfurt, Germany. Cropped and reversed on a vertical axis, this image became identified with the rabbi, who fled the town after he was arrested and falsely accused of burning down the crowded Jewish section of Frankfurt. He had been released after proved innocent in trial, but still held to blame by the Christian public, documented in antisemitic writings, accusations later replicated by the Jewish Haskallah movement, and even modern day Researchers

His picture of a bearded man (probably depicting a German rabbi) is thought to be "a type more than a picture".
