= Maria Katharina Prestel =

German artist (1747–1794)

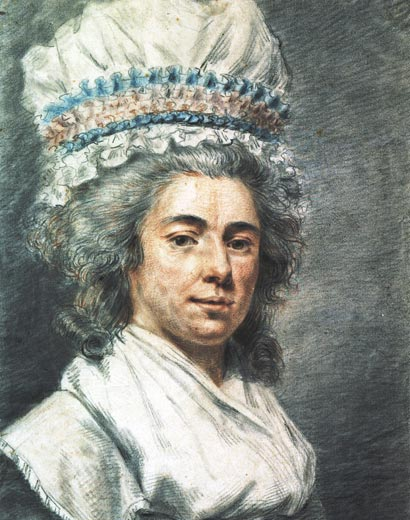
- Portrait of Maria Katharina Prestel by Johann Gottlieb Prestel, 1780. (Pastel on paper)
- Born: Maria Katharina Höll; 22 July 1747; Nuremberg, Germany
- Died: 16 March 1794 (aged 46); London, United Kingdom
- Known for: Painting, Engraving
- Spouse: Johann Gottlieb Prestel (m. 1769–1786)

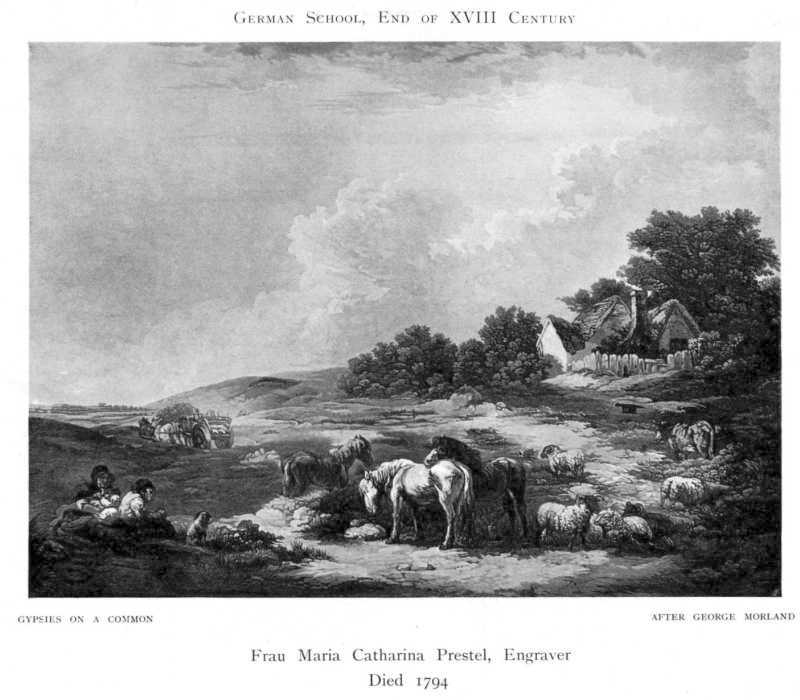
Maria Katharina Prestel - Gypsies on a Common

Maria Katharina Prestel (22 July 1747 – 16 March 1794) née Maria Katharina Höll, was an engraver and painter from Nuremberg, and active in London.

== Biography ==
Prestel, daughter of Maria and Thomas Höll, was born in Nuremberg where she became a pupil of Johann Gottlieb Prestel. She married Prestel in 1769 but the couple separated in 1786, at which point she moved to London with her daughter Ursula Magdalena Prestel. There she worked for John Boydell making aquatints. Her painting Gypsies on a Common was included in the 1905 book Women Painters of the World.

Prestel's career in London was quite successful and by the time of her death in 1794, she had produced more than seventy three engraving plates after works by German, Italian, and Dutch artists. She was celebrated for her large aquatint landscape prints, through which she skillfully replicated subtle details of romanticized landscape paintings. Prestel died in Greater London.

Learning engraving and painting techniques from her mother and father, Prestel's daughter, Ursula Magdalena Prestel moved to Brussels to begin her own career as an artist.
