= Corinthian order =

Order of classical architecture

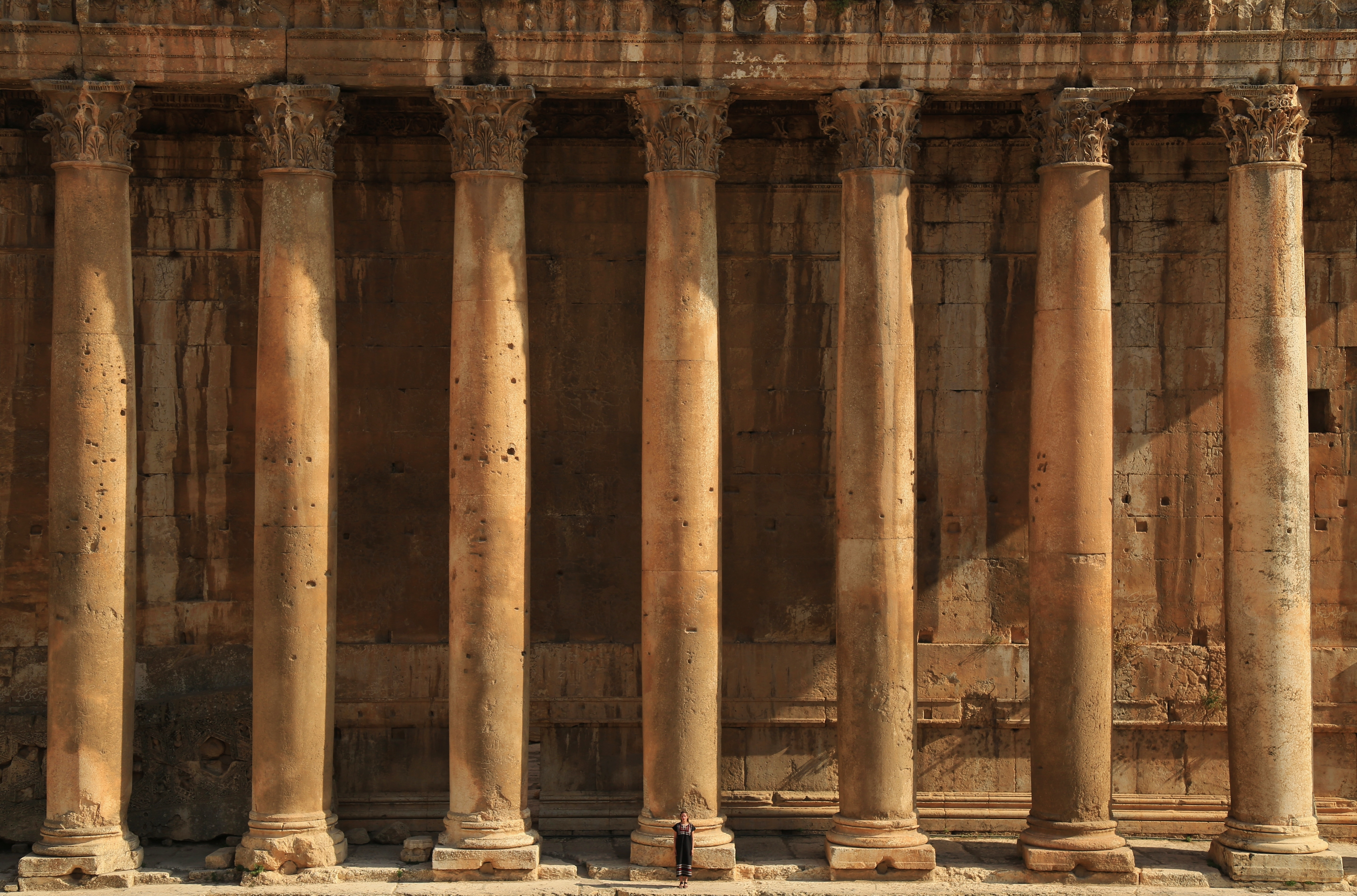
Corinthian peripteros of the Temple of Bacchus, Baalbek, Lebanon, unknown architect, 150–250

Nabataean variation of Corinthian columns, from the Alkhazneh, Petra, unknown architect, early first century AD

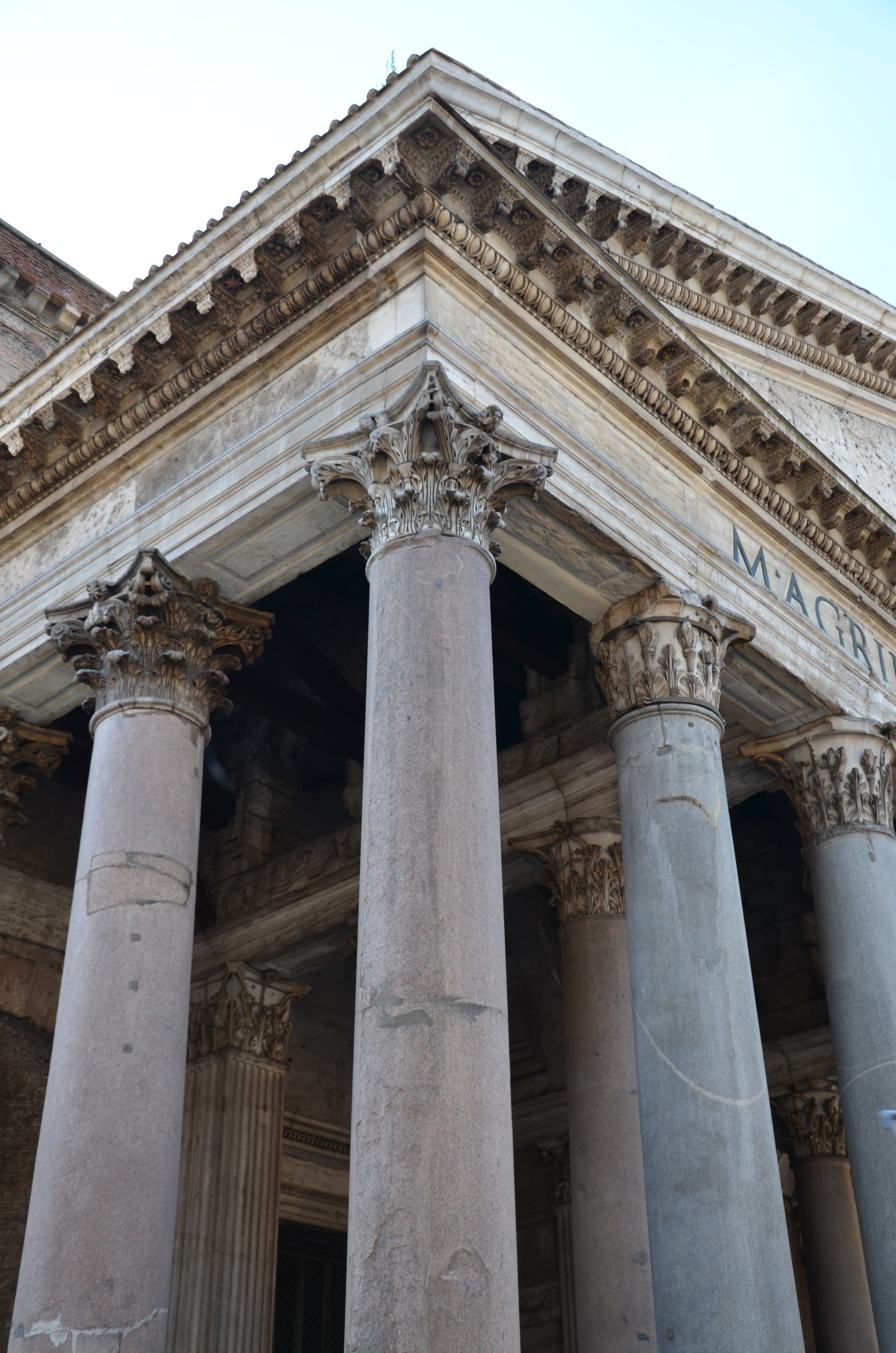
Corinthian columns from the Pantheon, Rome, unknown architect, c. 114–124 AD, which provided a prominent model for Renaissance and later architects

Comparisons of the Doric, Tuscan, Ionic, Corinthian and Composite orders; with staircase

The Corinthian order (Greek: Κορινθιακὸς ῥυθμός, Korinthiakós rythmós; Latin: Ordo Corinthius) is the last developed and most ornate of the three principal classical orders of Ancient Greek architecture and later used in Roman architecture and Nabataean architecture. The other two are the Doric order, which was the earliest, followed by the Ionic order. In Ancient Greek architecture, the Corinthian order follows the Ionic in almost all respects, other than the capitals of the columns, though this changed in Roman architecture.

A Corinthian capital may be seen as an enriched development of the Ionic capital, though one may have to look closely at a Corinthian capital to see the Ionic volutes ("helices"), at the corners, perhaps reduced in size and importance, scrolling out above the two ranks of stylized acanthus leaves and stalks ("cauliculi" or caulicoles), eight in all, and to notice that smaller volutes scroll inwards to meet each other on each side. The leaves may be quite stiff, schematic and dry, or they may be extravagantly drilled and undercut, naturalistic and spiky. The flat abacus at the top of the capital has a concave curve on each face, and usually a single flower ("rosette") projecting from the leaves below overlaps it on each face.

When classical architecture was revived during the Renaissance, two more orders were added to the canon: the Tuscan order and the Composite order, known in Roman times, but regarded as a grand imperial variant of the Corinthian. The Corinthian has fluted columns and elaborate capitals decorated with acanthus leaves and scrolls. There are many variations.

The name Corinthian is derived from the ancient Greek city of Corinth, although it was probably invented in Athens.

== Description ==
=== Greek Corinthian order ===
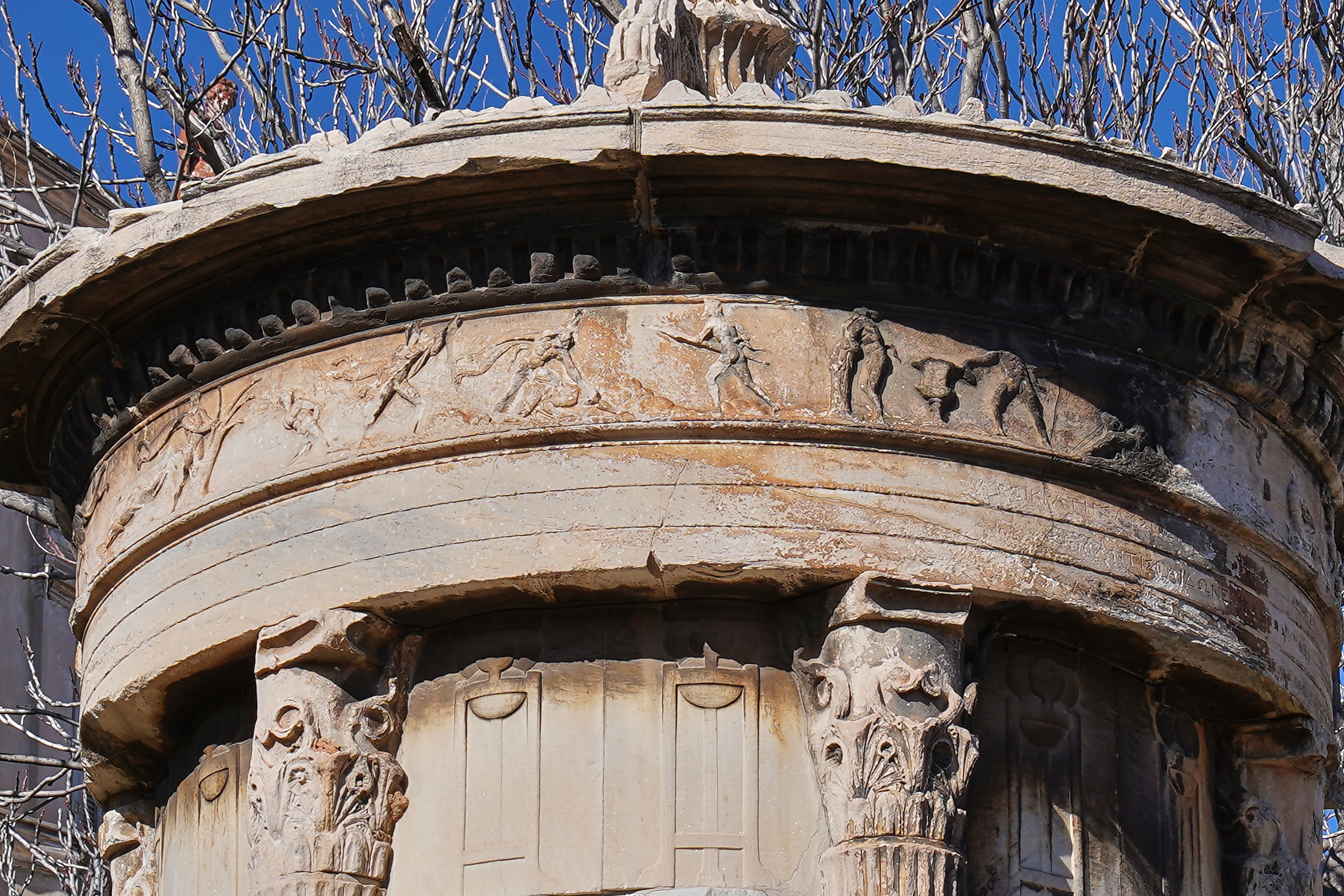
Frieze and capitals of the Choragic Monument of Lysicrates, Athens, unknown architect, 330s BC, one of the earliest surviving examples

The Corinthian order is named for the Greek city-state of Corinth, to which it was connected in the period. However, according to the architectural historian Vitruvius, the column was created by the sculptor Callimachus, probably an Athenian, who drew acanthus leaves growing around a votive basket of toys, with a slab on top, on the grave of a Corinthian girl.

Its earliest use can be traced back to the Late Classical Period (430–323 BC). The earliest Corinthian capitals, already in fragments and now lost, were found in Bassae in 1811–12; they are dated around 420 BC, and are in a temple of Apollo otherwise using the Ionic. There were three of them, carrying the frieze across the far end of the cella, which was open to the adytum. The Corinthian was probably devised to solve the awkwardness the Ionic capital created at corners by having clear and distinct front or back and side-on faces, a problem only finally solved by Vincenzo Scamozzi in the 16th century.

A simplified late version of the Greek Corinthian capital is often known as the "Tower of the Winds Corinthian" after its use on the porches of the Tower of the Winds in Athens (about 50 BC). There is a single row of acanthus leaves at the bottom of the capital, with a row of "tall, narrow leaves" behind. These cling tightly to the swelling shaft, and are sometimes described as "lotus" leaves, as well as the vague "water-leaves" and palm leaves; their similarity to leaf forms on many ancient Egyptian capitals has been remarked on. The form is usually found in smaller columns, both ancient and modern.

=== Roman Corinthian order ===
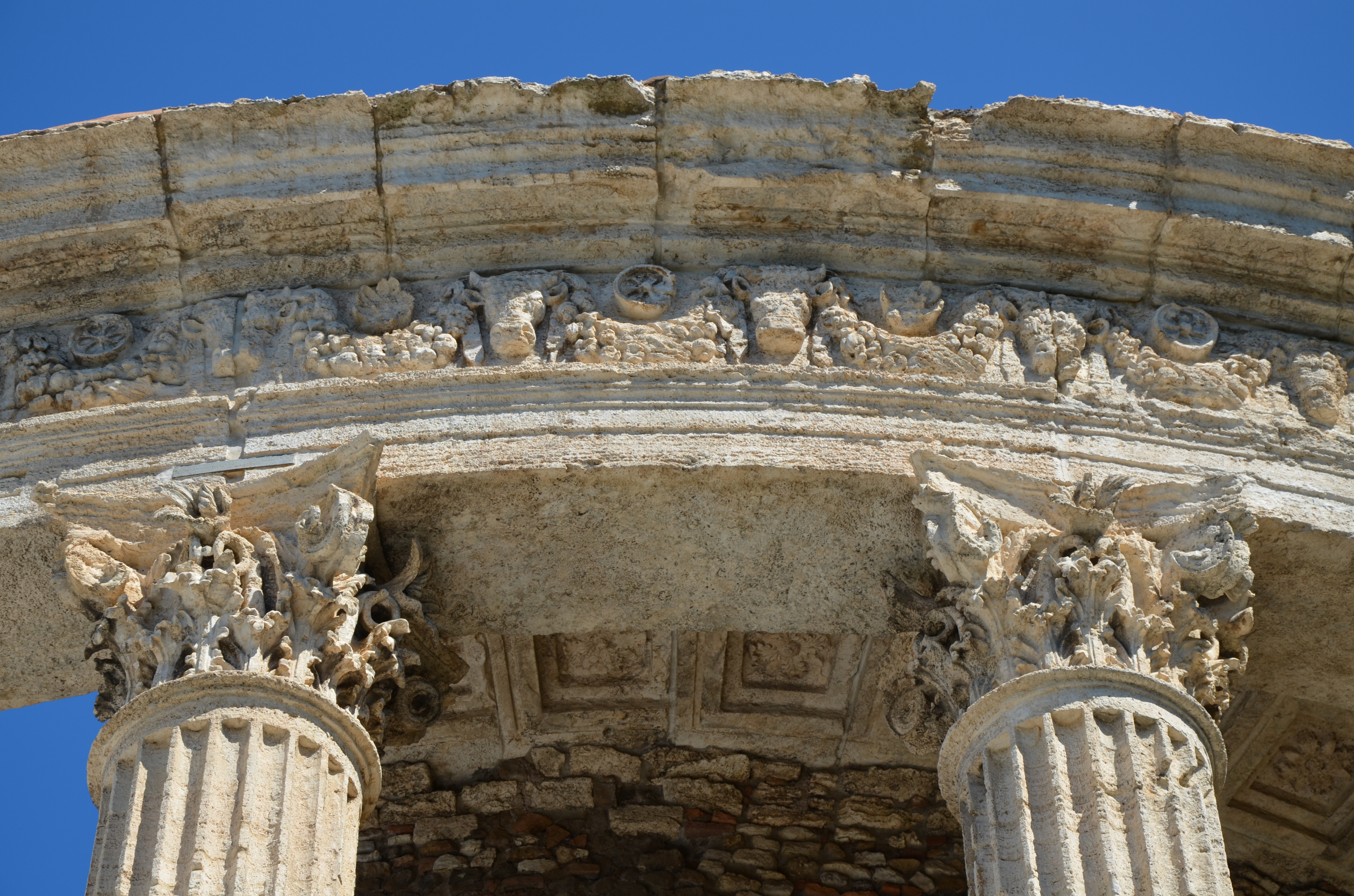
Bucrania with festoons decorating the Temple of Vesta from Hadrian's Villa, Tivoli

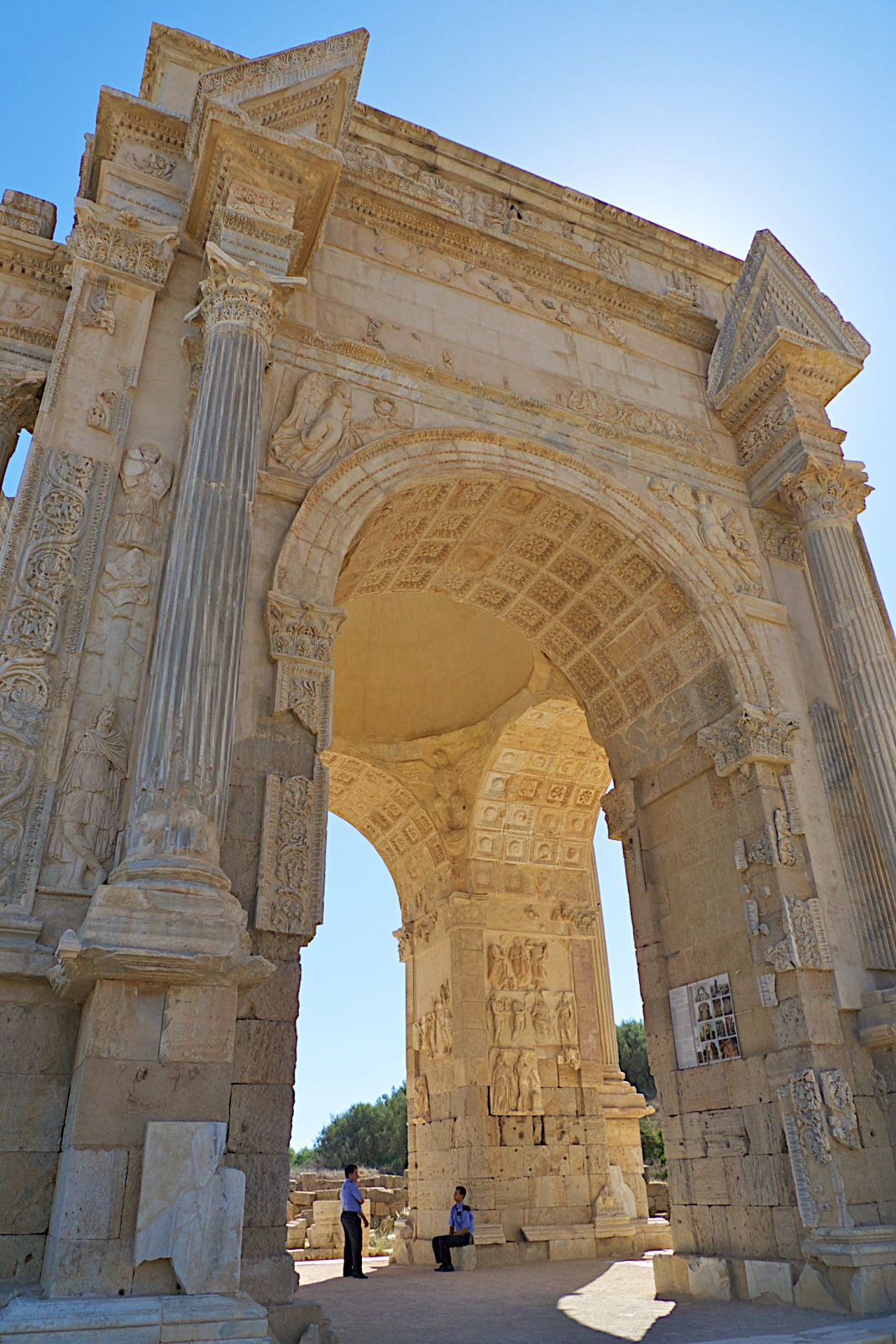
Corinthian columns of the Arch of Septimius Severus in Leptis Magna

The style developed its own model in Roman practice, following precedents set by the Temple of Mars Ultor in the Forum of Augustus (c. 2 AD). It was employed in southern Gaul at the Maison Carrée, Nîmes and at the comparable Temple of Augustus and Livia at Vienne. Other prime examples noted by Mark Wilson Jones are the lower order of the Basilica Ulpia and the Arch of Trajan at Ancona (both of the reign of Trajan, 98–117 AD), the Column of Phocas (re-erected in Late Antiquity but 2nd century in origin), and the Temple of Bacchus at Baalbek (c. 150 AD).

Proportion is a defining characteristic of the Corinthian order: the "coherent integration of dimensions and ratios in accordance with the principles of symmetria" are noted by Mark Wilson Jones, who finds that the ratio of total column height to column-shaft height is in a 6:5 ratio, so that, secondarily, the full height of column with capital is often a multiple of 6 Roman feet while the column height itself is a multiple of 5. In its proportions, the Corinthian column is similar to the Ionic column, though it is more slender, and stands apart by its distinctive carved capital.

The abacus upon the capital has concave sides to conform to the outscrolling corners of the capital, and it may have a rosette at the center of each side. Corinthian columns were erected on the top level of the Roman Colosseum, holding up the least weight, and also having the slenderest ratio of thickness to height. Their height to width ratio is about 10:1.

One variant is the Tivoli order, found at the Temple of Vesta, Tivoli. The Tivoli order's Corinthian capital has two rows of acanthus leaves and its abacus is decorated with oversize fleurons in the form of hibiscus flowers with pronounced spiral pistils. The column flutes have flat tops. The frieze exhibits fruit festoons suspended between bucrania. Above each festoon has a rosette over its center. The cornice does not have modillions.

=== Gandharan capitals ===
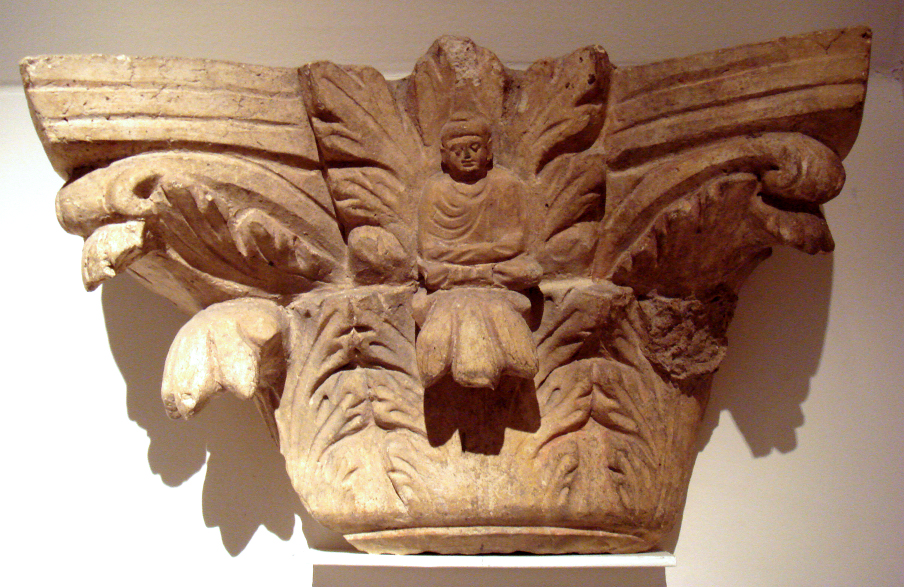
Figure of the Buddha, within a Corinthian capital from Gandhara, Musee Guimet, Paris, unknown architect, 3rd–4th century

Indo-Corinthian capitals are capitals crowning columns or pilasters, which can be found in the northwestern Indian subcontinent, and usually combine Hellenistic and Indian elements. These capitals are typically dated to the 1st centuries of our era, and constitute important elements of Greco-Buddhist art of Gandhara.

The classical design was often adapted, usually taking a more elongated form, and sometimes being combined with scrolls, generally within the context of Buddhist stupas and temples. Indo-Corinthian capitals also incorporated figures of the Buddha or Bodhisattvas, usually as central figures surrounded, and often in the shade, of the luxurious foliage of Corinthian designs.

=== Byzantine Empire and medieval Europe ===
Though the term "Corinthian" is reserved for columns and capitals that adhere fairly closely to one of the classical versions, vegetal decoration to capitals continued to be extremely common in Byzantine architecture and the various styles of the European Middle Ages, from Carolingian architecture to Romanesque architecture and Gothic architecture. There was considerable freedom in the details and the relationship between column (generally not fluted) and capital. Many types of plant were represented, sometimes realistically, as in the capitals in the chapter house at Southwell Minster in England.

=== Renaissance Corinthian order ===
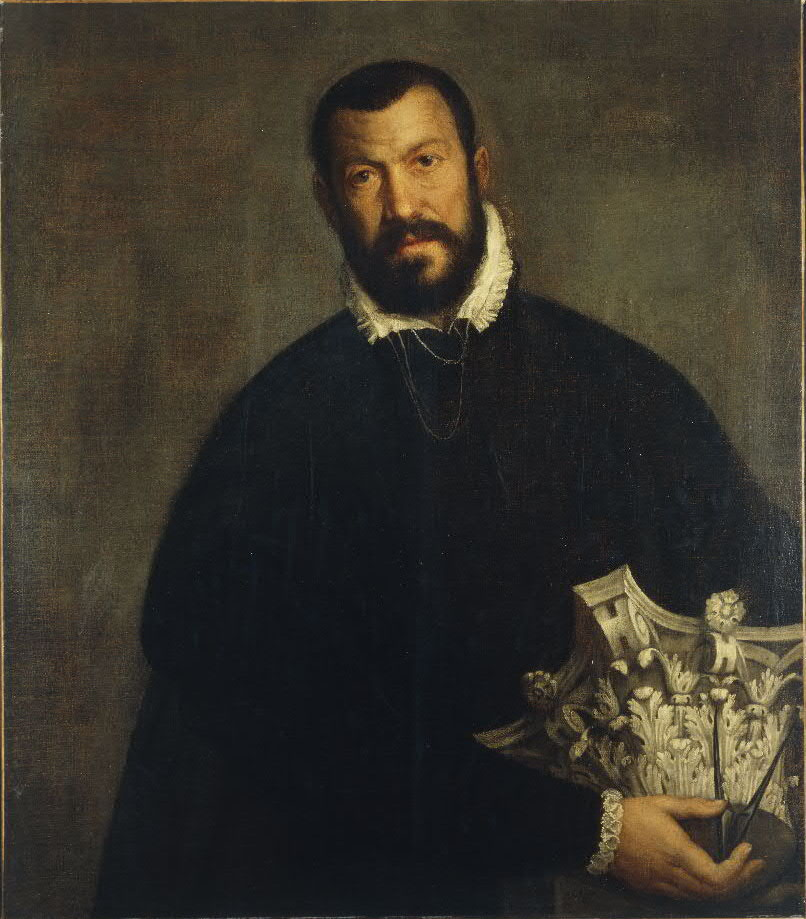
Vincenzo Scamozzi offers his version of the Corinthian capital, in a portrait by Veronese (Denver Art Museum)

During the first flush of the Italian Renaissance, the Florentine architectural theorist Francesco di Giorgio expressed the human analogies that writers who followed Vitruvius often associated with the human form, in squared drawings he made of the Corinthian capital overlaid with human heads, to show the proportions common to both.

The Corinthian architrave is divided in two or three sections, which may be equal, or may bear interesting proportional relationships, to one with another. Above the plain, unadorned architrave lies the frieze, which may be richly carved with a continuous design or left plain, as at the U.S. Capitol extension. At the Capitol the proportions of architrave to frieze are exactly 1:1. Above that, the profiles of the cornice mouldings are like those of the Ionic order. If the cornice is very deep, it may be supported by brackets or modillions, which are ornamental brackets used in a series under a cornice.

The Corinthian column is almost always fluted, and the flutes of a Corinthian column may be enriched. They may be filleted, with rods nestled within the hollow flutes, or stop-fluted, with the rods rising a third of the way, to where the entasis begins. In French, these are called chandelles and sometimes terminate in carved wisps of flame, or with bellflowers. Alternatively, beading or chains of husks may take the place of the fillets in the fluting, Corinthian being the most flexible of the orders, with more opportunities for variation.

Elaborating upon an offhand remark when Vitruvius accounted for the origin of its acanthus capital, it became a commonplace to identify the Corinthian column with the slender figure of a young girl; in this mode the classifying French painter Nicolas Poussin wrote to his friend Fréart de Chantelou in 1642:

The beautiful girls whom you will have seen in Nîmes will not, I am sure, have delighted your spirit any less than the beautiful columns of Maison Carrée for the one is no more than an old copy of the other.

Sir William Chambers expressed the conventional comparison with the Doric order:

The proportions of the orders were by the ancients formed on those of the human body, and consequently, it could not be their intention to make a Corinthian column, which, as Vitruvius observes, is to represent the delicacy of a young girl, as thick and much taller than a Doric one, which is designed to represent the bulk and vigour of a muscular full grown man.

== History ==
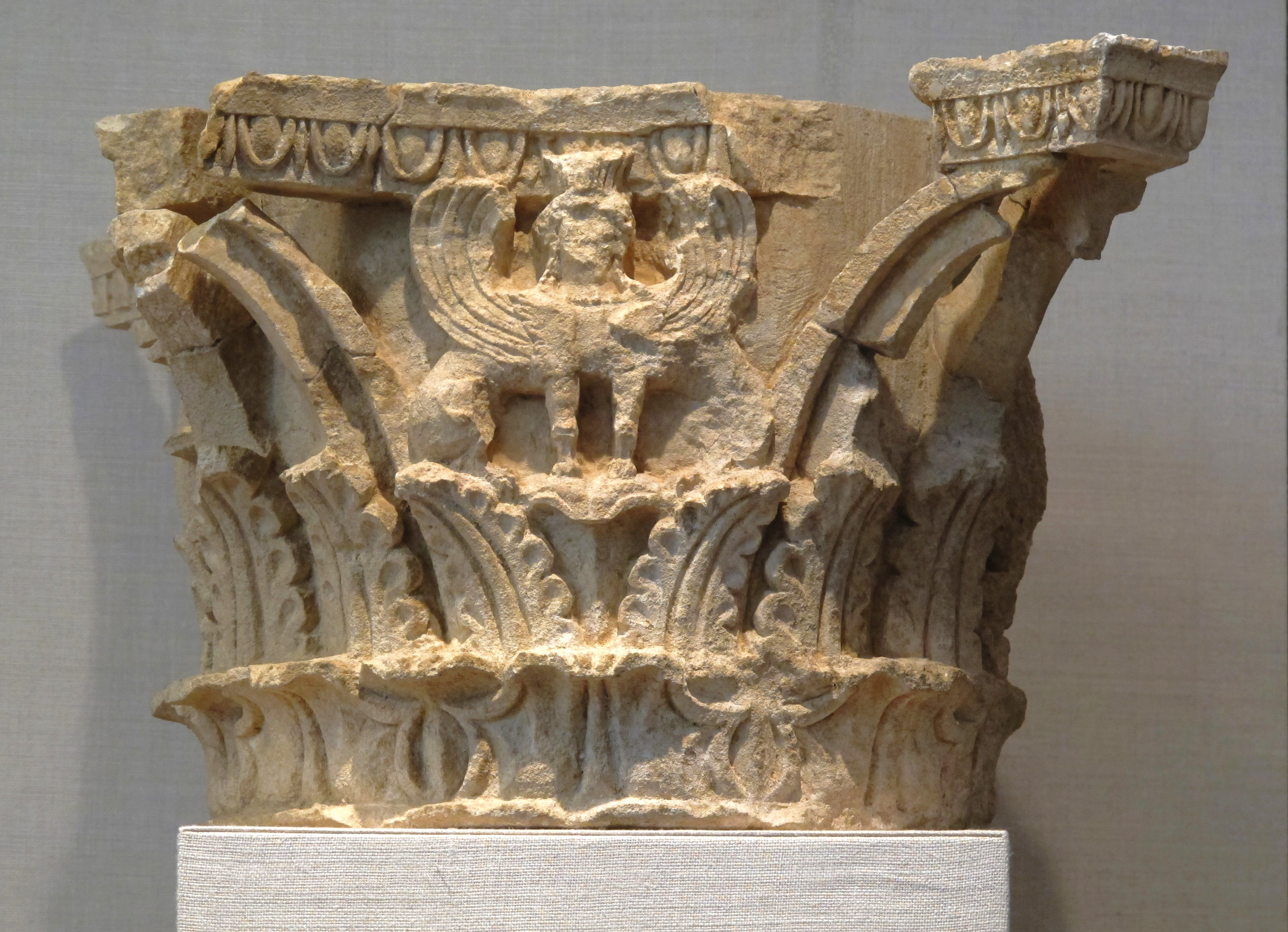
Ancient Greek capital from Tarentum with addorsed sphinxes, 4th–3rd centuries BC, made of limestone, in the Metropolitan Museum of Art, New York City

The oldest known example of a Corinthian column is in the Temple of Apollo Epicurius at Bassae in Arcadia, c. 450–420 BC. It is not part of the order of the temple itself, which has a Doric colonnade surrounding the temple and an Ionic order within the cella enclosure. A single Corinthian column stands free, centered within the cella. This is a mysterious feature, and archaeologists debate what this shows: some state that it is simply an example of a votive column. A few examples of Corinthian columns in Greece during the next century are all used inside temples. A more famous example, and the first documented use of the Corinthian order on the exterior of a structure, is the circular Choragic Monument of Lysicrates in Athens, erected c. 334 BC.

A Corinthian capital carefully buried in antiquity in the foundations of the circular tholos at Epidaurus was recovered during modern archaeological campaigns. Its enigmatic presence and preservation have been explained as a sculptor's model for stonemasons to follow in erecting the temple dedicated to Asclepius. The architectural design of the building was credited in antiquity to the sculptor Polykleitos the Younger, son of the Classical Greek sculptor Polykleitos the Elder.

The temple was erected in the 4th century BC. These capitals, in one of the most-visited sacred sites of Greece, influenced later Hellenistic and Roman designs for the Corinthian order. The concave sides of the abacus meet at a sharp keel edge, easily damaged, which in later and post-Renaissance practice has generally been replaced by a canted corner. Behind the scrolls the spreading cylindrical form of the central shaft is plainly visible.

Much later, the Roman writer Vitruvius (c. 75 BC – c. 15 BC) related that the Corinthian order had been invented by Callimachus, a Greek architect and sculptor who was inspired by the sight of a votive basket that had been left on the grave of a young girl. A few of her toys were in it, and a square tile had been placed over the basket, to protect them from the weather. An acanthus plant had grown through the woven basket, mixing its spiny, deeply cut leaves with the weave of the basket.

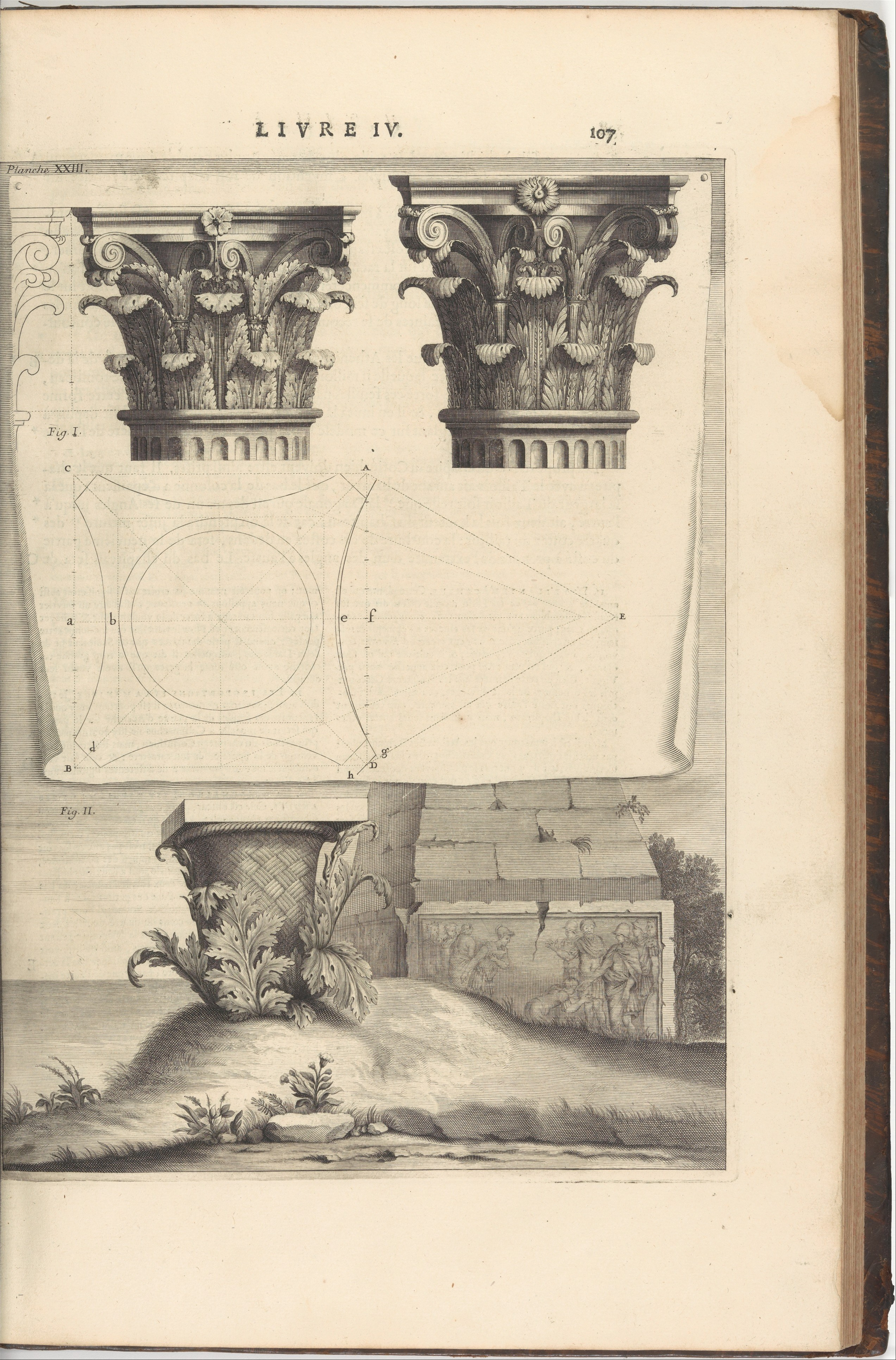
The origin of the Corinthian order, illustrated in Claude Perrault's translation of the ten books of Vitruvius, 1684

Claude Perrault incorporated a vignette epitomizing the Callimachus tale in his illustration of the Corinthian order for his translation of Vitruvius, published in Paris, 1684. Perrault demonstrates in his engraving how the proportions of the carved capital could be adjusted according to demands of the design, without offending. The texture and outline of Perrault's leaves is dry and tight compared to their 19th-century naturalism at the U.S. Capitol.

In Late Antique and Byzantine practice, the leaves may be blown sideways, as if by the wind of Faith. Unlike the Doric and Ionic column capitals, a Corinthian capital has no neck beneath it, just a ring-like astragal molding or a banding that forms the base of the capital, recalling the base of the legendary basket.

Most buildings (and most clients) are satisfied with just two orders. When orders are superposed one above another, as they are at the Colosseum, the natural progression is from sturdiest and plainest (Doric) at the bottom, to slenderest and richest (Corinthian) at the top. The Colosseum's topmost tier has an unusual order that came to be known as the Composite order during the 16th century. The mid-16th-century Italians, especially Sebastiano Serlio and Jacopo Barozzi da Vignola, who established a canonic version of the orders, thought they detected a "Composite order", combining the volutes of the Ionic with the foliage of the Corinthian, but in Roman practice volutes were almost always present.

In Romanesque and Gothic architecture, where the Classical system had been replaced by a new aesthetic composed of arched vaults springing from columns, the Corinthian capital was still retained. It might be severely plain, as in the typical Cistercian architecture, which encouraged no distraction from liturgy and ascetic contemplation, or in other contexts it could be treated to numerous fanciful variations, even on the capitals of a series of columns or colonettes within the same system.

During the 16th century, a sequence of engravings of the orders in architectural treatises helped standardize their details within rigid limits: Sebastiano Serlio; the Regola delli cinque ordini of Giacomo Barozzi da Vignola (1507–1573); I quattro libri dell'architettura of Andrea Palladio, and Vincenzo Scamozzi's L'idea dell'architettura universale, were followed in the 17th century by French treatises with further refined engraved models, such as Perrault's.

== Notable examples ==
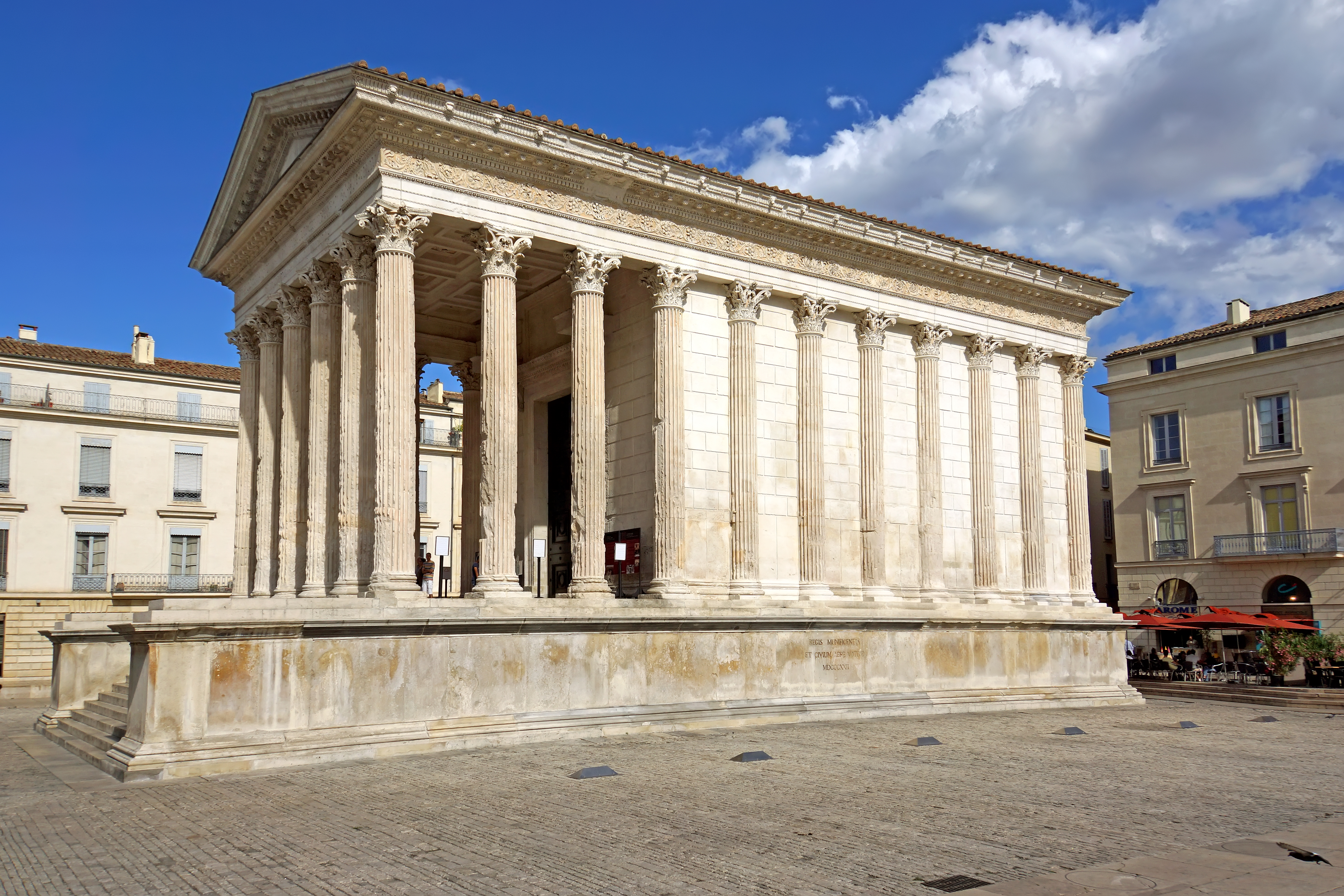
The Maison Carrée, Nîmes, France, unknown architect, 1st century AD

- Argentina
  - Palace of the Argentine National Congress
  - Buenos Aires Metropolitan Cathedral
- Bangladesh
  - Tajhat Palace, Rangpur
- France
  - Maison Carrée, Nîmes
  - La Madeleine, Paris
  - Hôtel de la Marine, Paris
  - Palais Bourbon, Paris
  - The July Column, Paris
- Germany
  - Palatine Chapel, Aachen
  - The Reichstag, Berlin
- Greece
  - Choragic Monument of Lysicrates, Athens
  - Temple of Olympian Zeus, Athens
  - Zappeion, Athens
- Hungary
  - Millennium Monument, Budapest
  - Hall of Art, Budapest
  - Museum of Fine Arts (Budapest)
  - Hungarian National Museum
- Israel
  - Seat of the Universal House of Justice, Haifa
- Italy
  - Pantheon, Rome
  - Temple of Mars Ultor
  - Temple of Vesta, Tivoli
  - Basilica of Saint Paul Outside the Walls
  - Basilica of Saint Mary the Great (upper tier)
- Japan
  - Bank of Japan Headquarters
  - Meiji Seimei Kan
  - NYK Maritime Museum
  - Osaka Prefectural Nakanoshima Library
- Jordan
  - Al-Khazneh, Petra (Nabataean variation)
  - Ancient Jerash
  - Amman Citadel (Jabal al-Qal'a), Amman
- Philippines
  - National Museum Complex
  - St. La Salle Hall
  - Don Enrique T. Yuchengco Hall
  - Enrique M. Razon Sports Center
- Portugal
  - Templo de Diana, Évora
  - São Bento Palace, Lisbon
  - Column of Pedro IV, Lisbon
- Romania
  - New Saint George Church of Bucharest
  - Royal Palace of Bucharest
  - The Church from the Antim Monastery
  - Central University Library of Bucharest
  - Monteoru House
- Russia
  - Winter Palace
  - Saint Isaac's Cathedral
- Serbia
  - House of the National Assembly of the Republic of Serbia
- Singapore
  - Former City Hall
- South Africa
  - Houses of Parliament, Cape Town
- Syria
  - Ancient Bosra
  - Temple of Bacchus, Latakia
  - Palmyra
  - Temple of Jupiter, Damascus
  - Umayyad Mosque, Damascus
- Ukraine
  - Great Lavra Belltower (fourth tier – 8 columns)
  - Independence Monument
- United Kingdom
  - Nelson's Column in Central London
  - St Paul's Cathedral, London (lower tier)
  - University College London
- United States of America
  - United States Capitol
  - United States Supreme Court Building
  - City Hall-County Building (Chicago)
  - The Rotunda, University of Virginia
  - New York Stock Exchange
- Vatican
  - St. Peter's Basilica

== Gallery ==
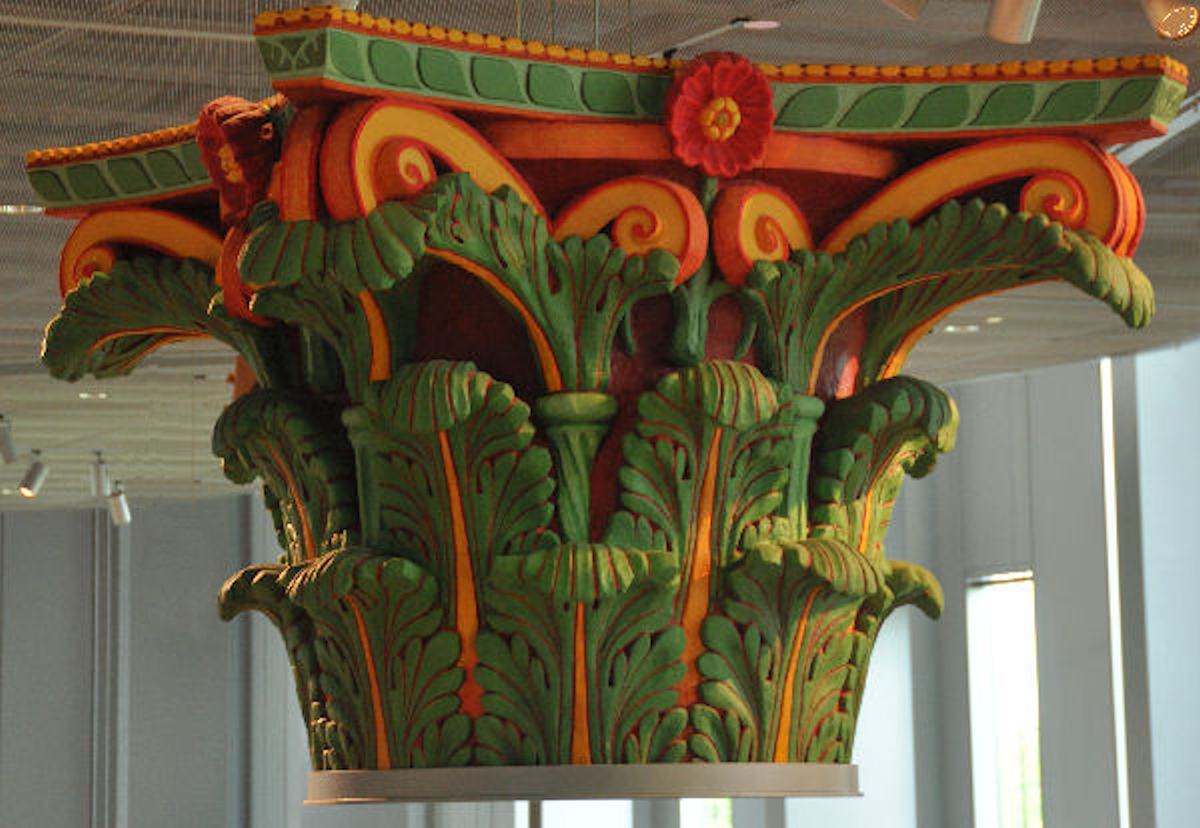
Reconstructed Corinthian capital from Xanten, with recreated colours

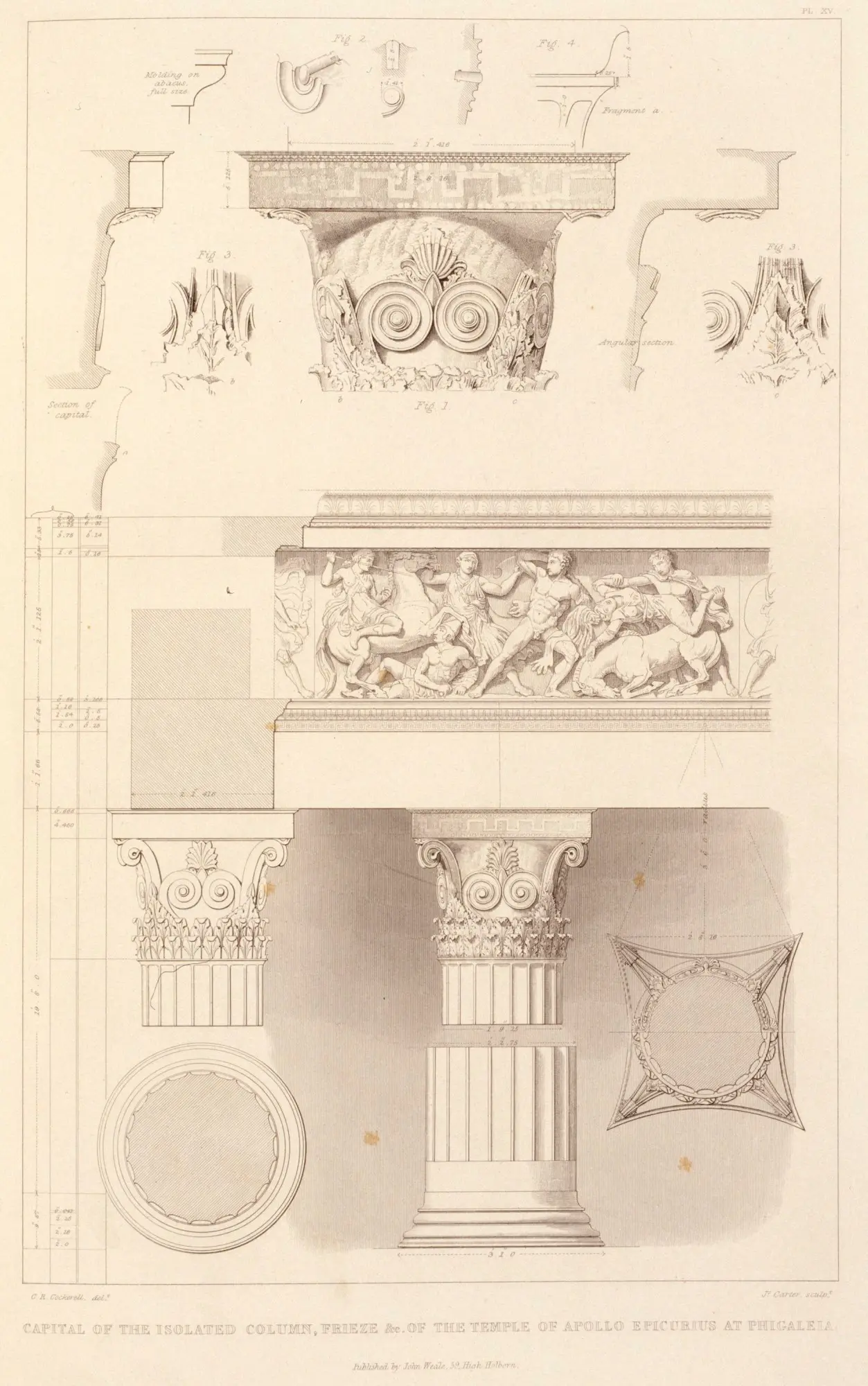
Ancient Greek Corinthian columns in the Temple of Apollo, Bassae, Greece, illustration by Charles Robert Cockerell, unknown architect, c.429–400 BC

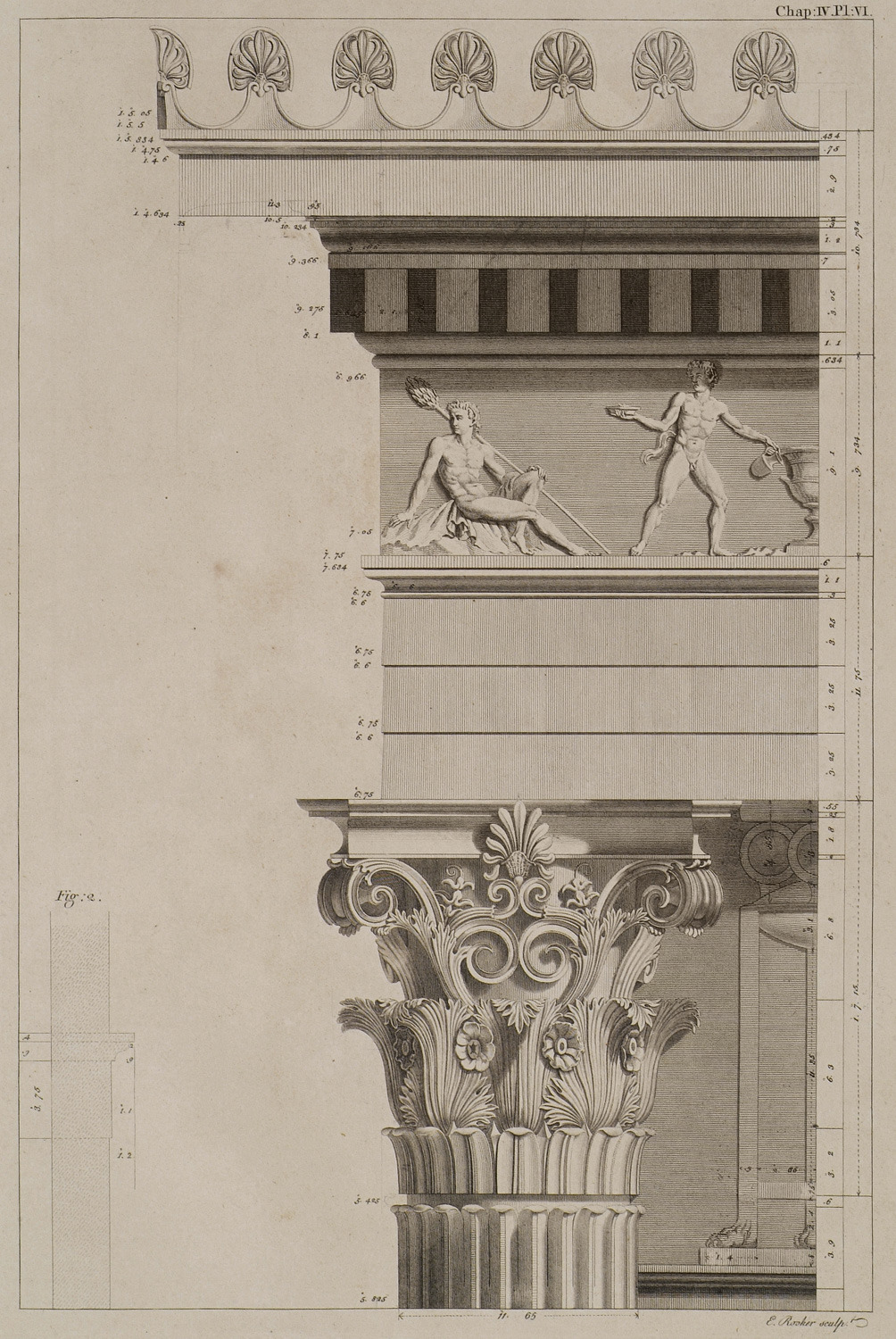
Ancient Greek Corinthian order of the Choragic Monument of Lysicrates, Athens, c.335 BC

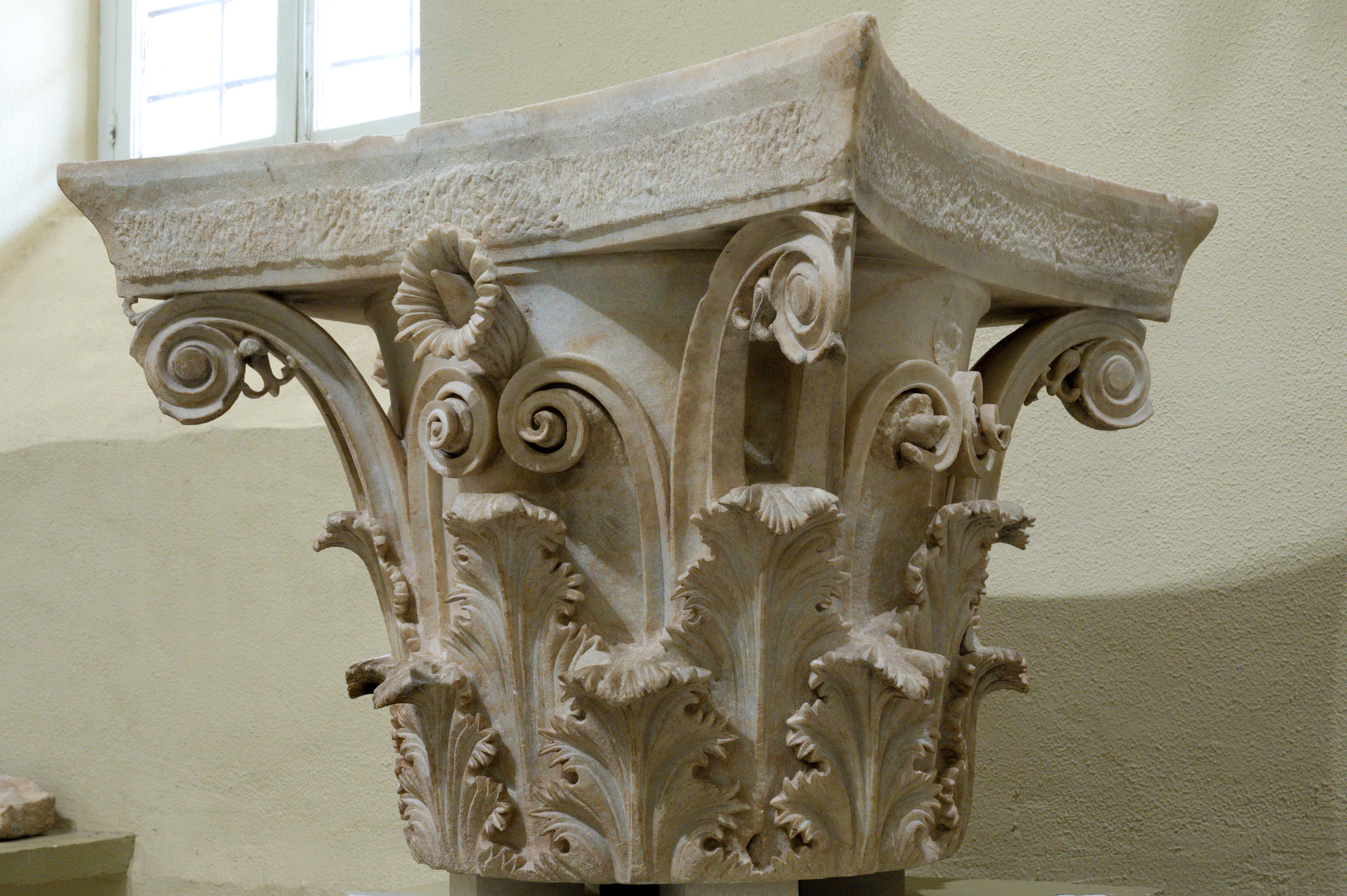
Ancient Greek Corinthian capital from the tholos at Epidaurus, Archaeological Museum of Epidaurus, Greece, said to have been designed by Polyclitus the Younger, c.350 BC

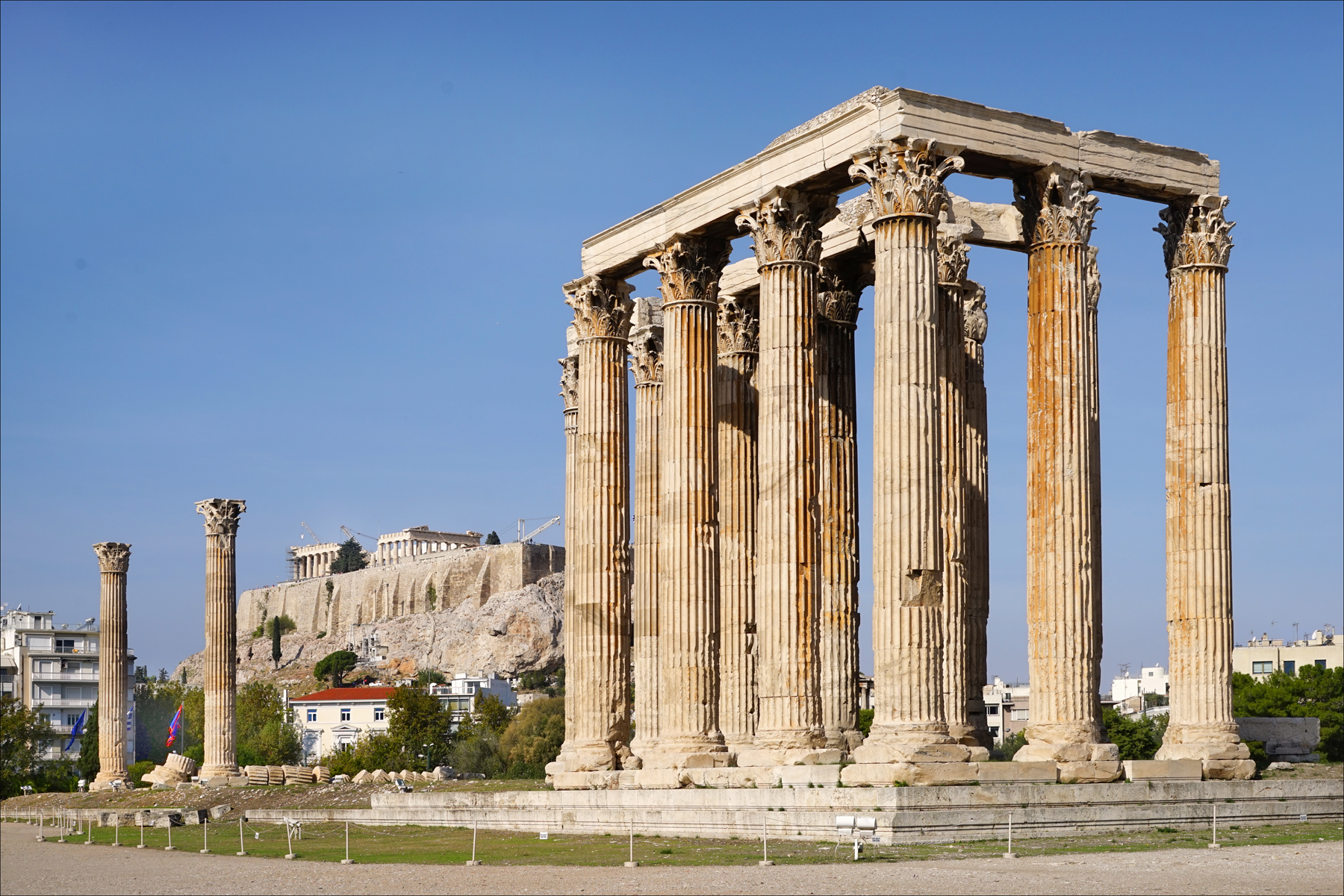
Roman Temple of Olympian Zeus, Athens, 174 BC–c.130 AD

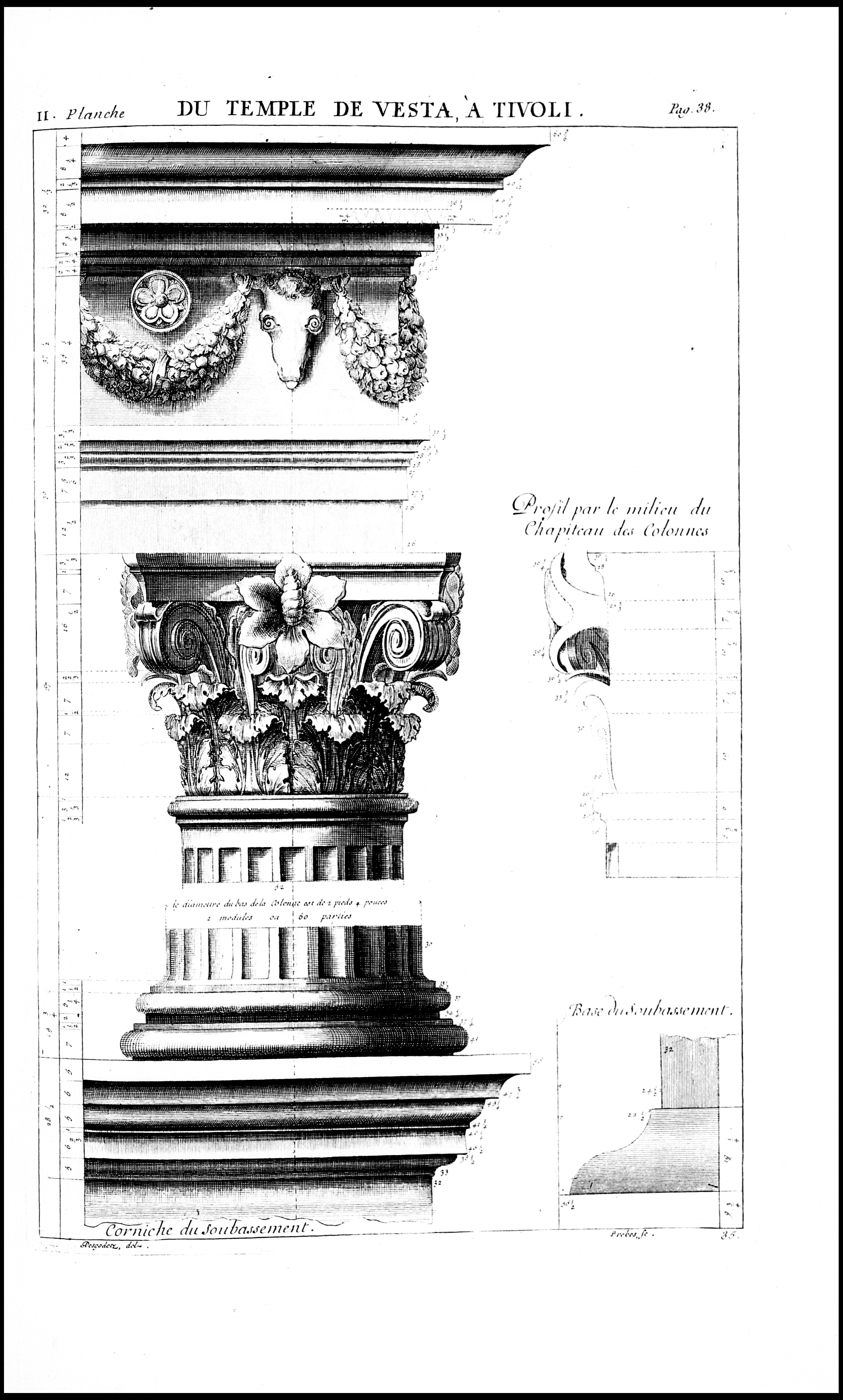
Roman Corinthian capital of the Temple of Vesta, Tivoli, Italy, with an oversized fleuron (flower) on the abacus, probably a stylized hibiscus blossom with spiral pistil, compressed acanthus rows, and flutes squared at the top, rather than rounded as on a standard Corinthian column, 1st century BC

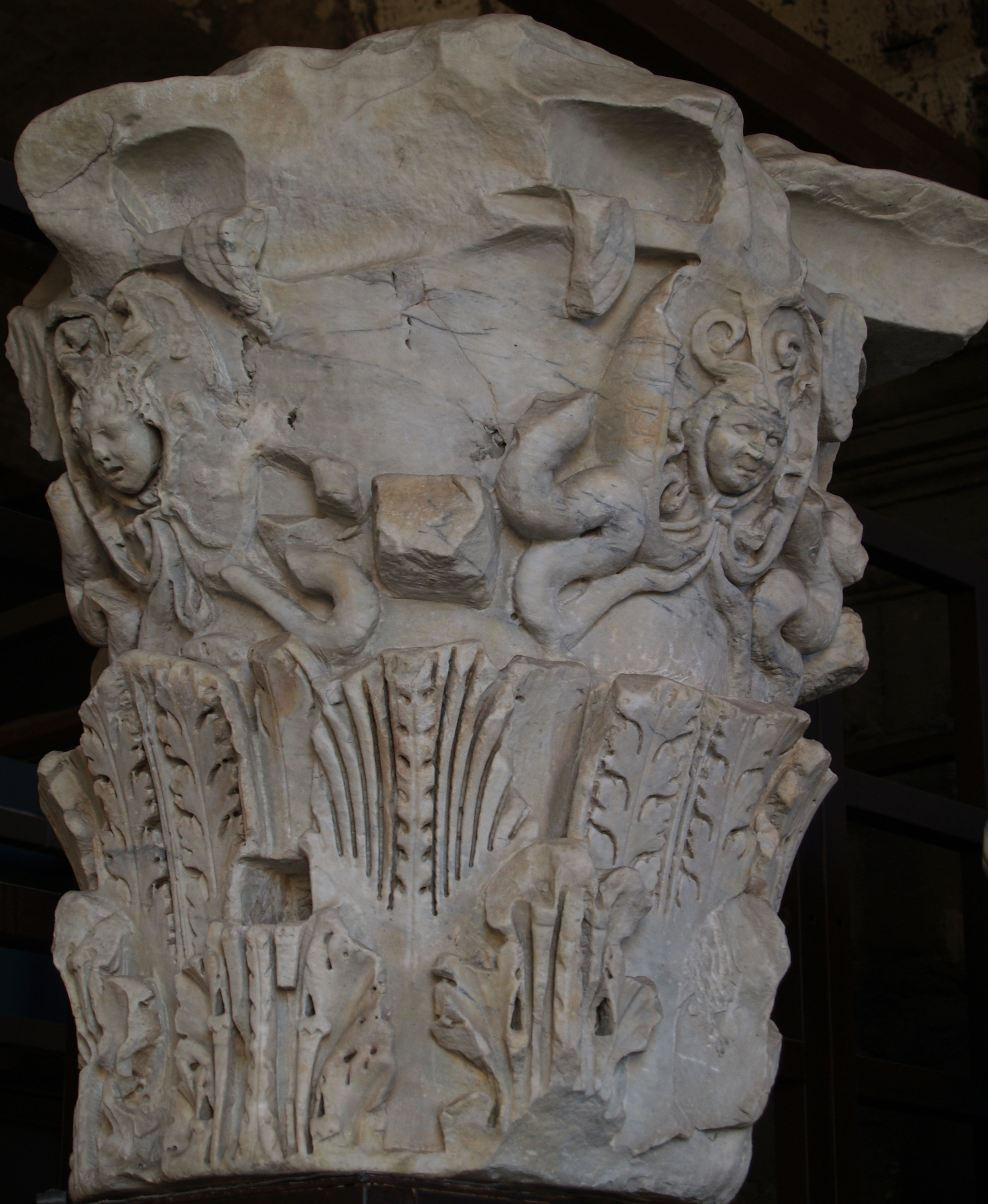
Roman Corinthian capital with gorgoneia from the Colosseum, Rome, 70–80 BC

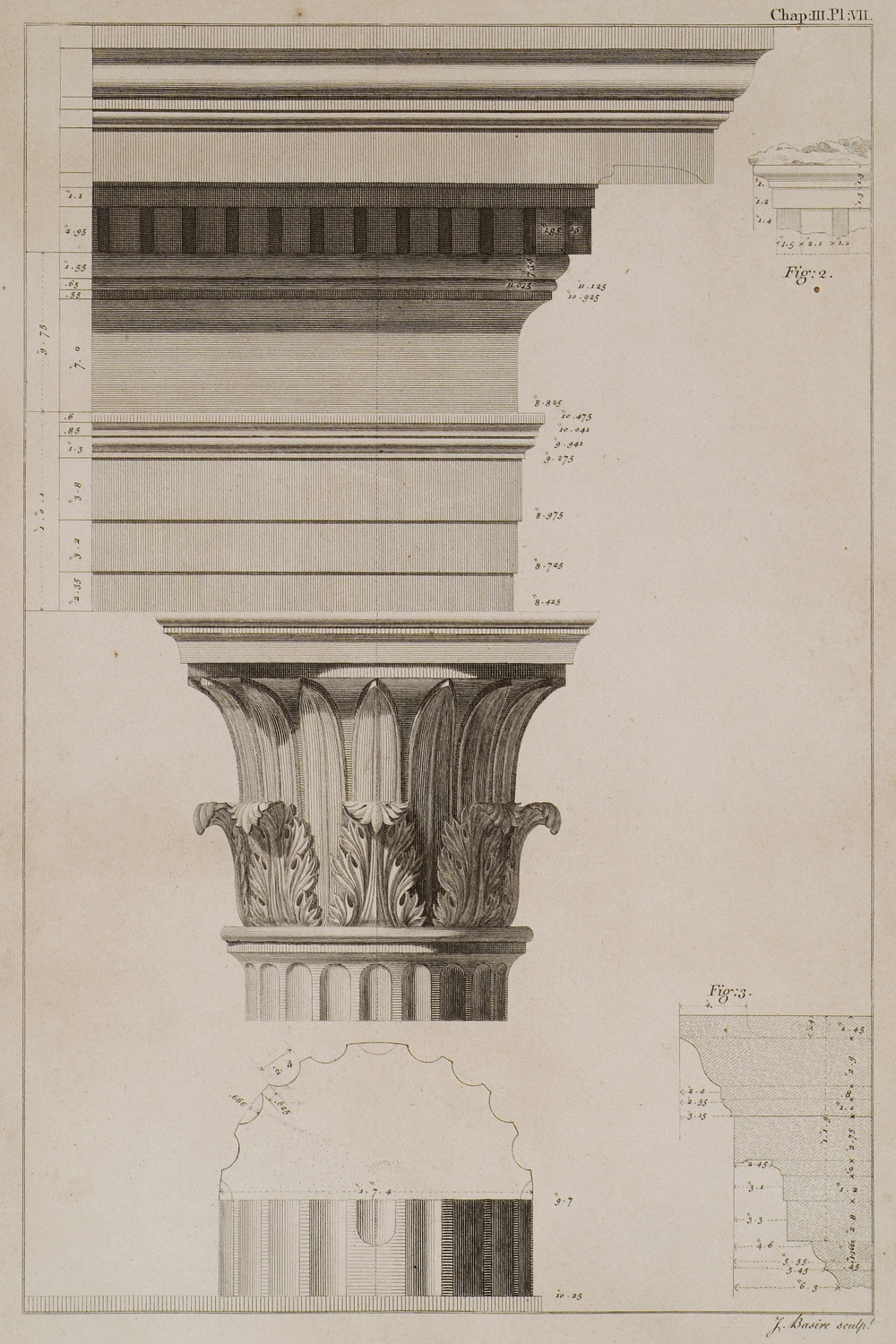
Ancient Greek Corinthian order of the Tower of the Winds, Athens, c.50 BC

Roman Corinthian capital of the Temple of Jupiter, Baalbek, Lebanon, 1st century AD

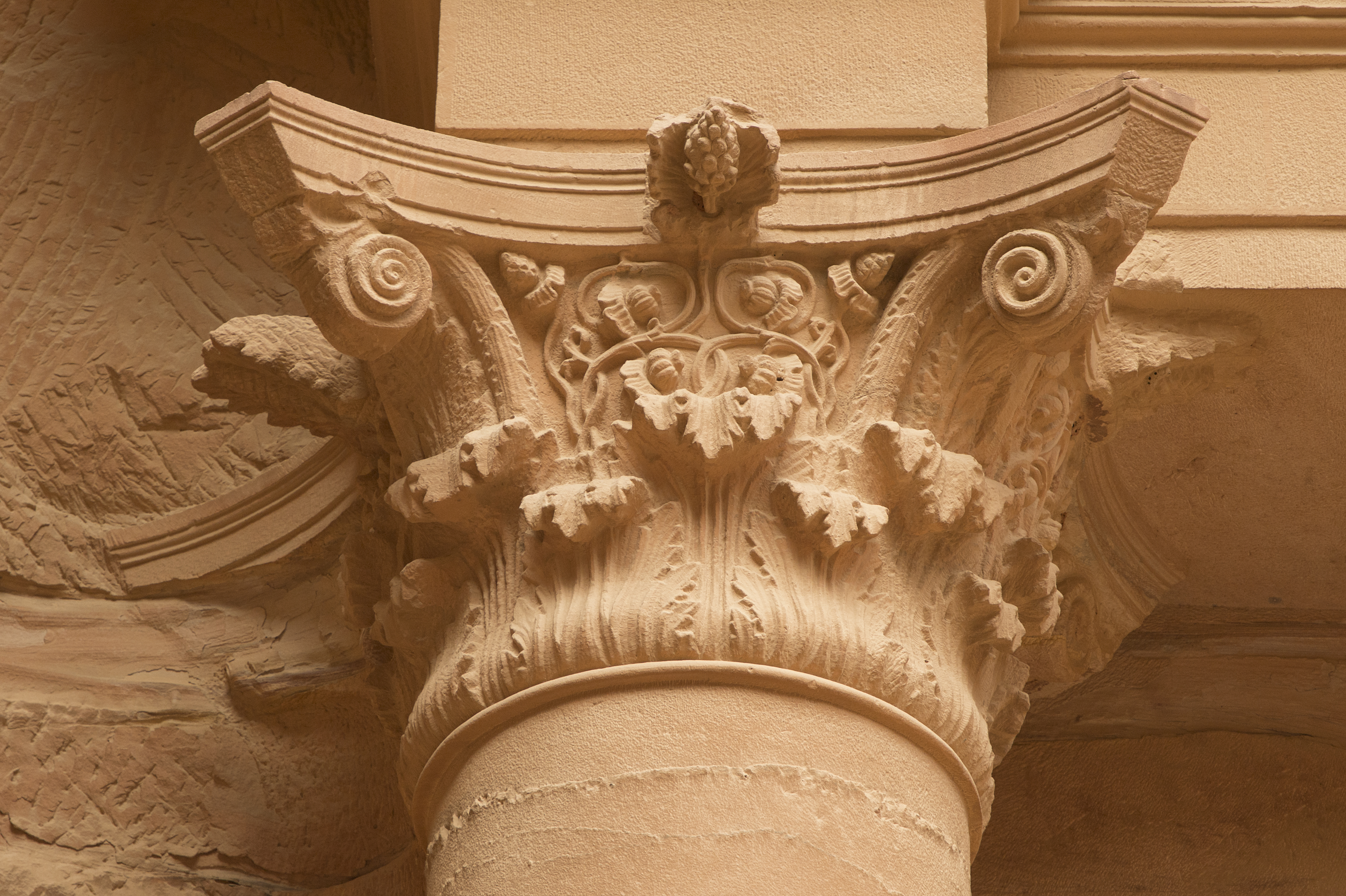
Nabataean Corinthian capital of Al-Khazneh, Petra, Jordan, decorated with acanthuses and rinceaux, early 1st century AD

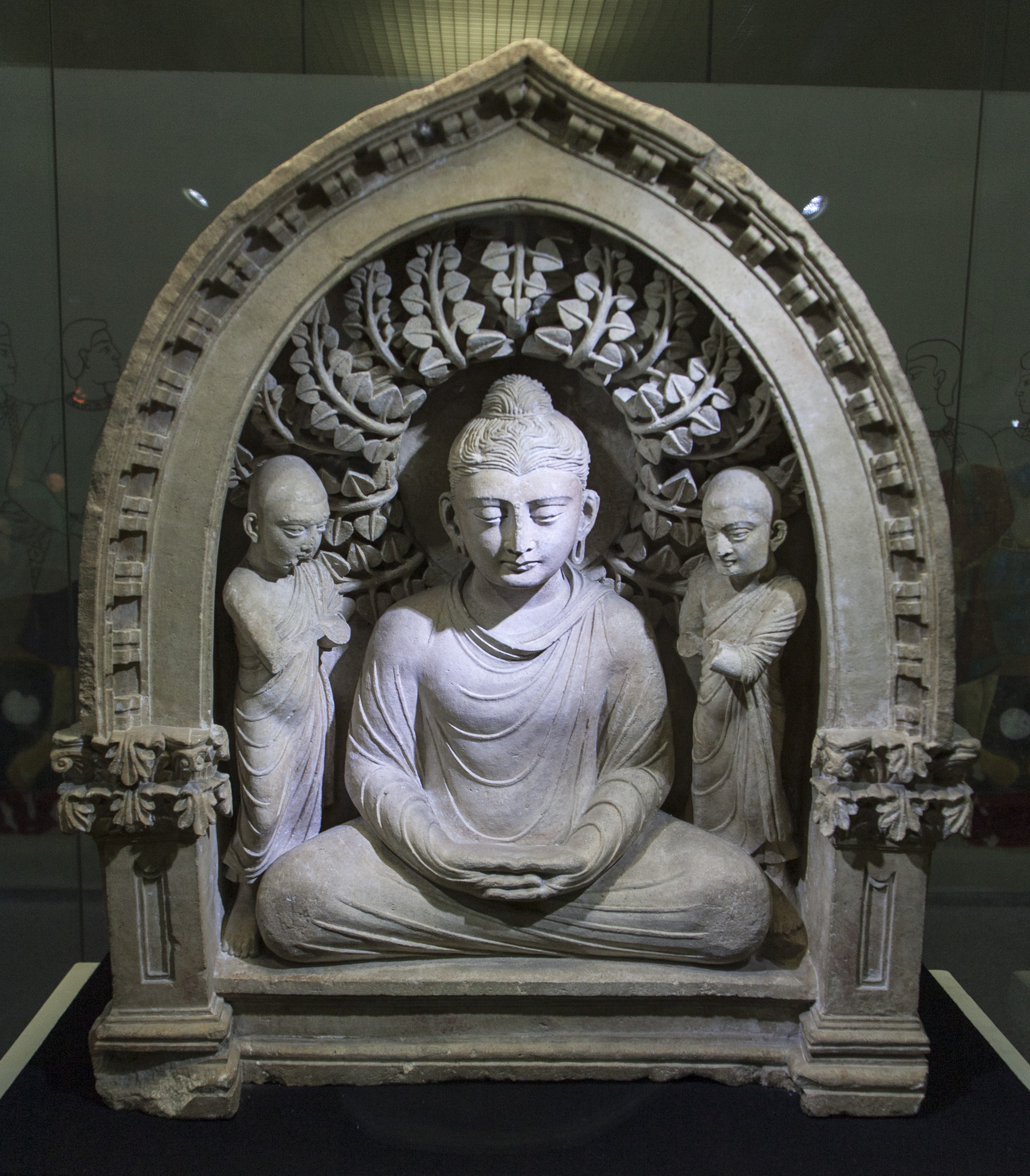
Group of Buddha seated between two monks, with two quasi-Corinthian pilasters that are here because of the influence of Greek culture during the Hellenistic period, 1st–3rd centuries, stone, State Museum of History of Uzbekistan, Tashkent

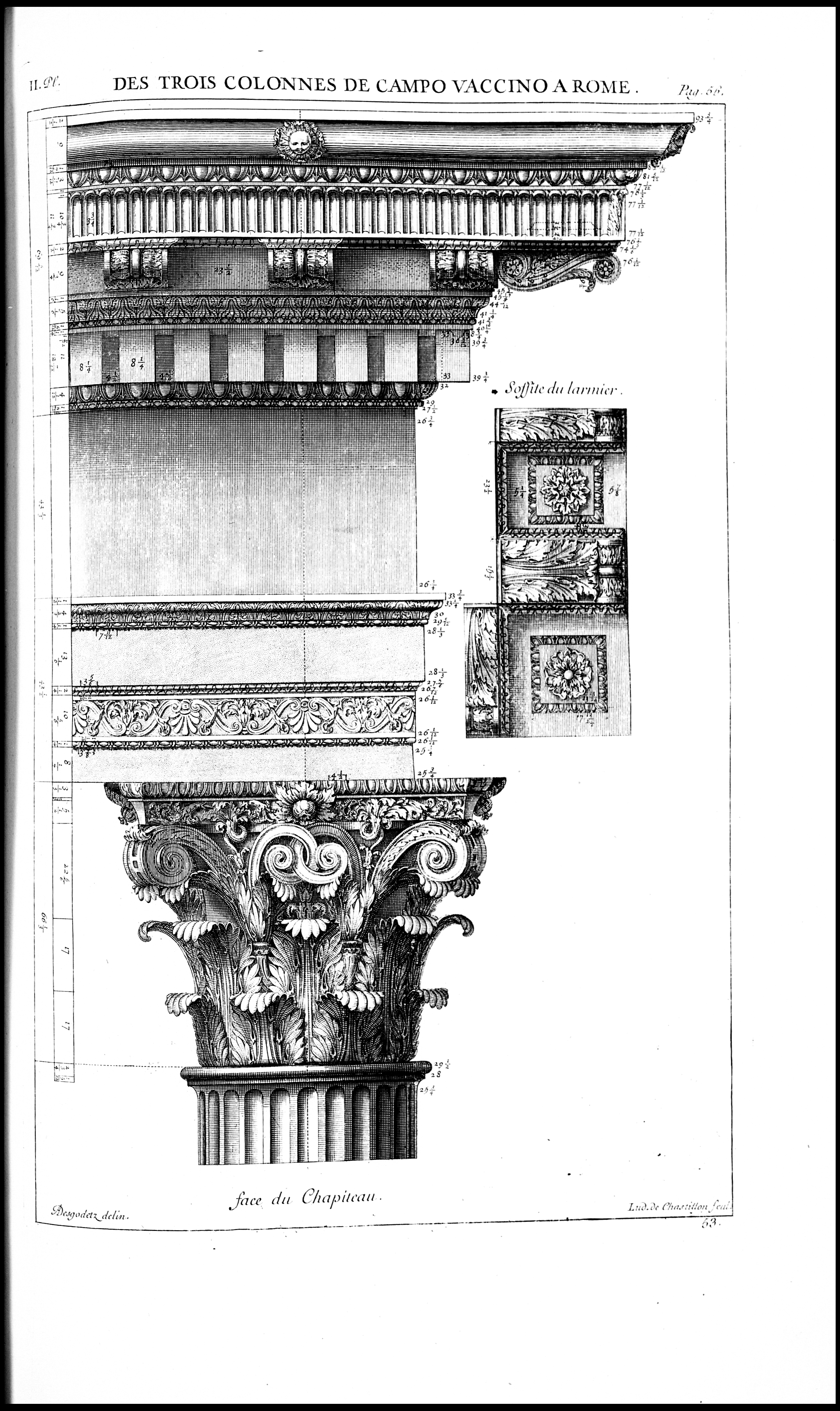
Roman Corinthian capital of the Temple of Castor and Pollux, Rome, with intertwining central stems, 1st century

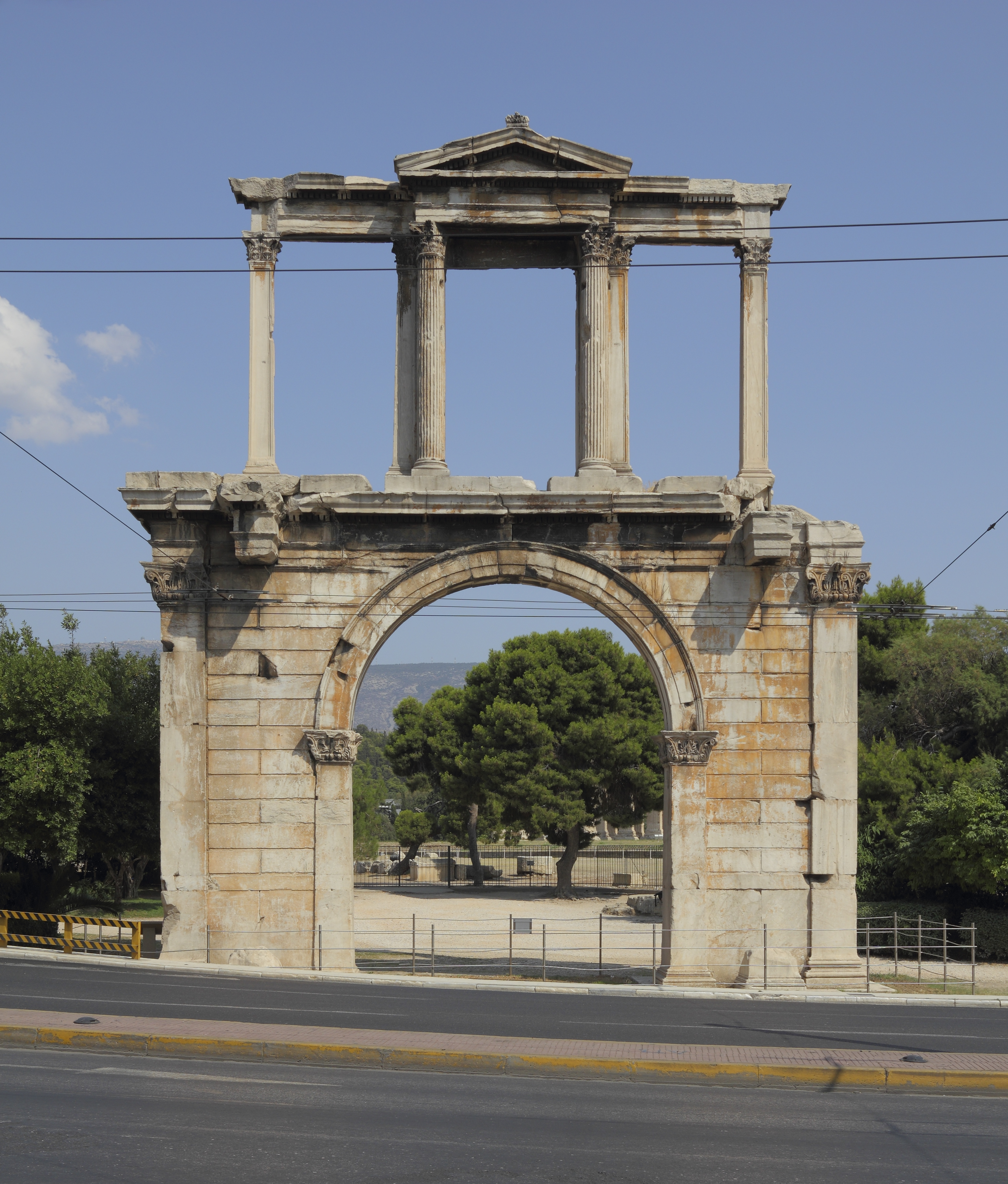
Roman Corinthian columns and pilasters of the Arch of Hadrian, Athens, 131 or 132 AD

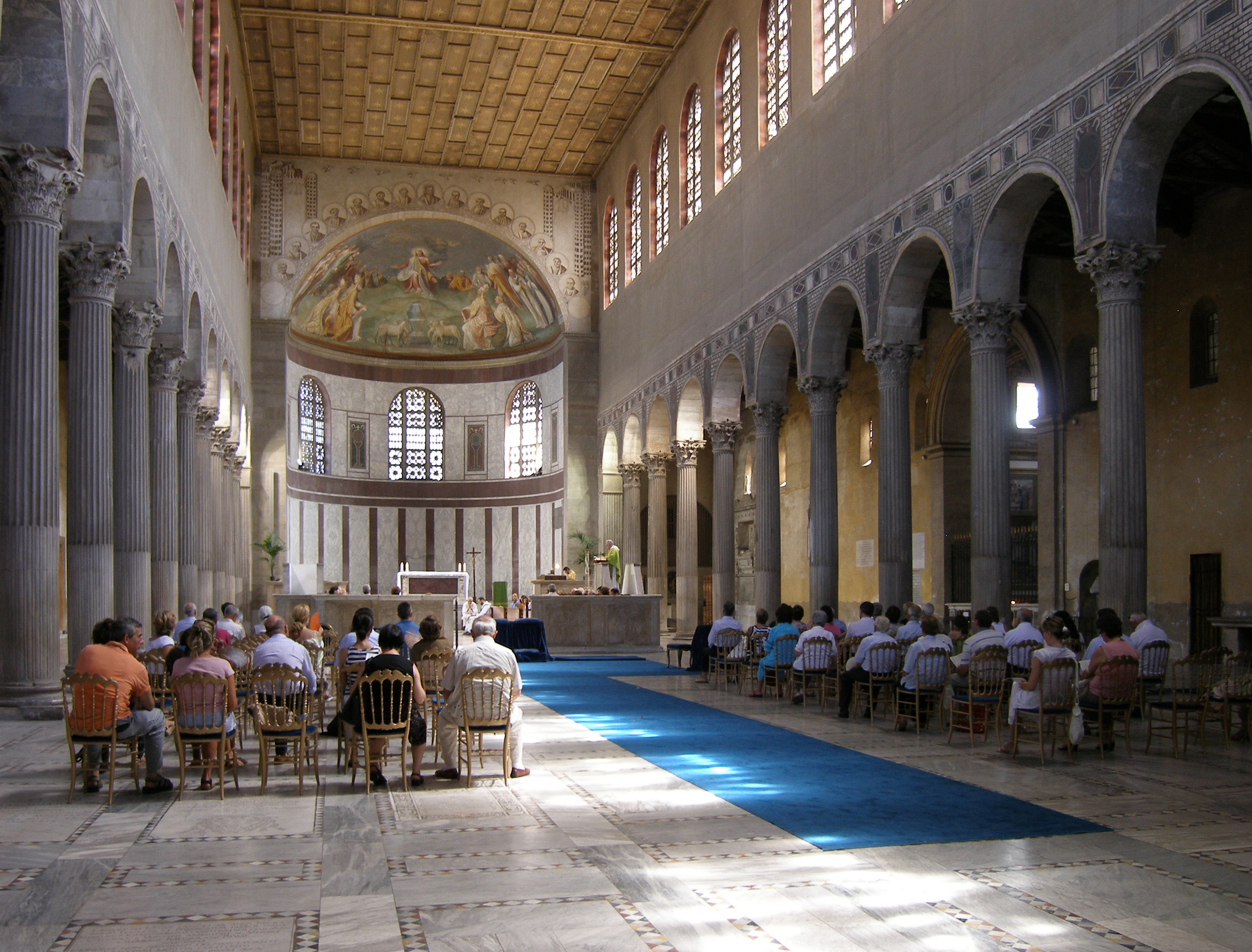
The Constantinian basilica of Santa Sabina interior, with spolia Corinthian columns from the Temple of Juno Regina

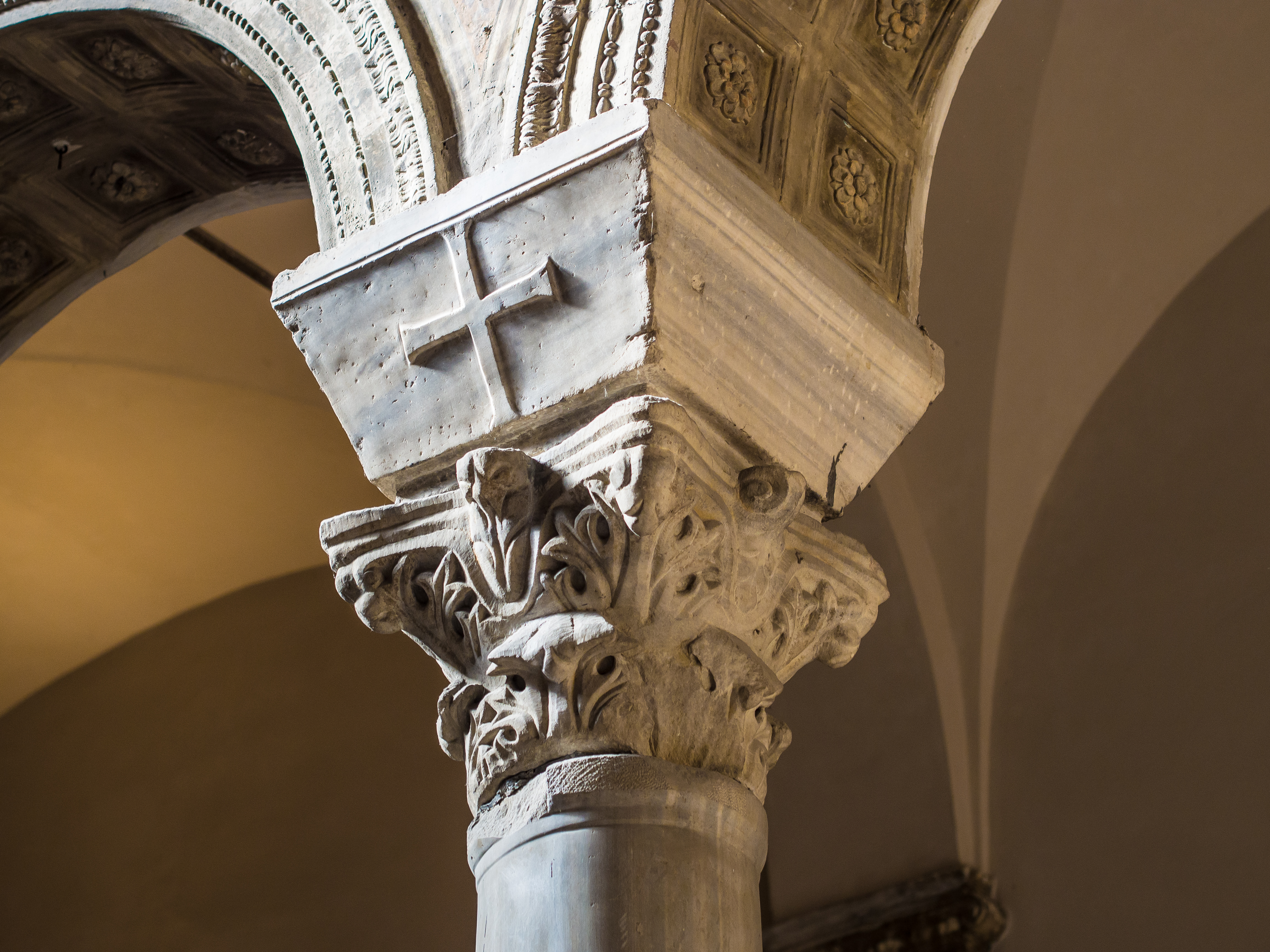
Byzantine quasi-Corinthian capital in Basilica of Sant'Apollinare Nuovo, Ravenna, Italy, 6th century

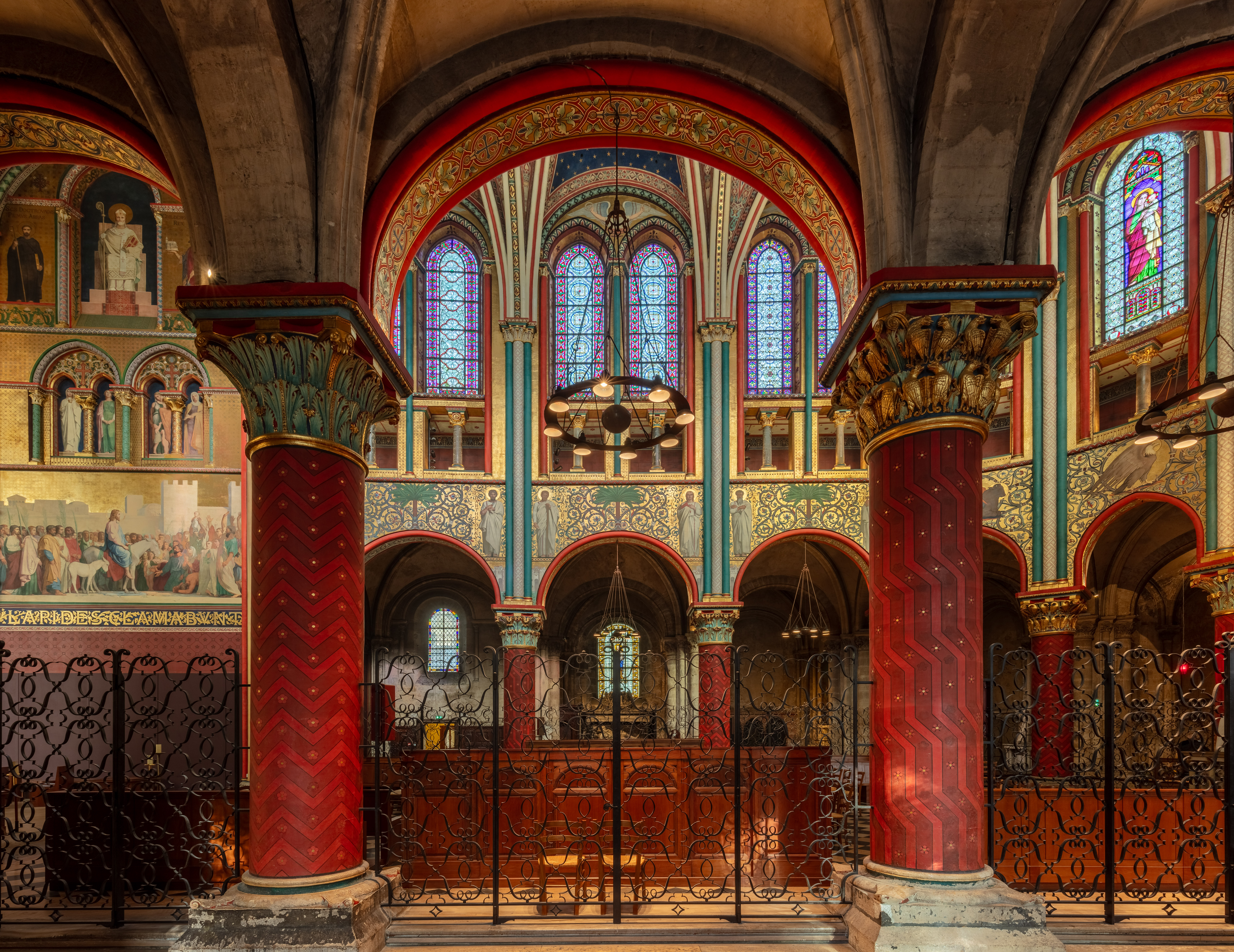
Romanesque quasi-Corinthian columns in Saint-Germain-des-Prés, Paris, 8th century, restored in the 19th century with original polychromy

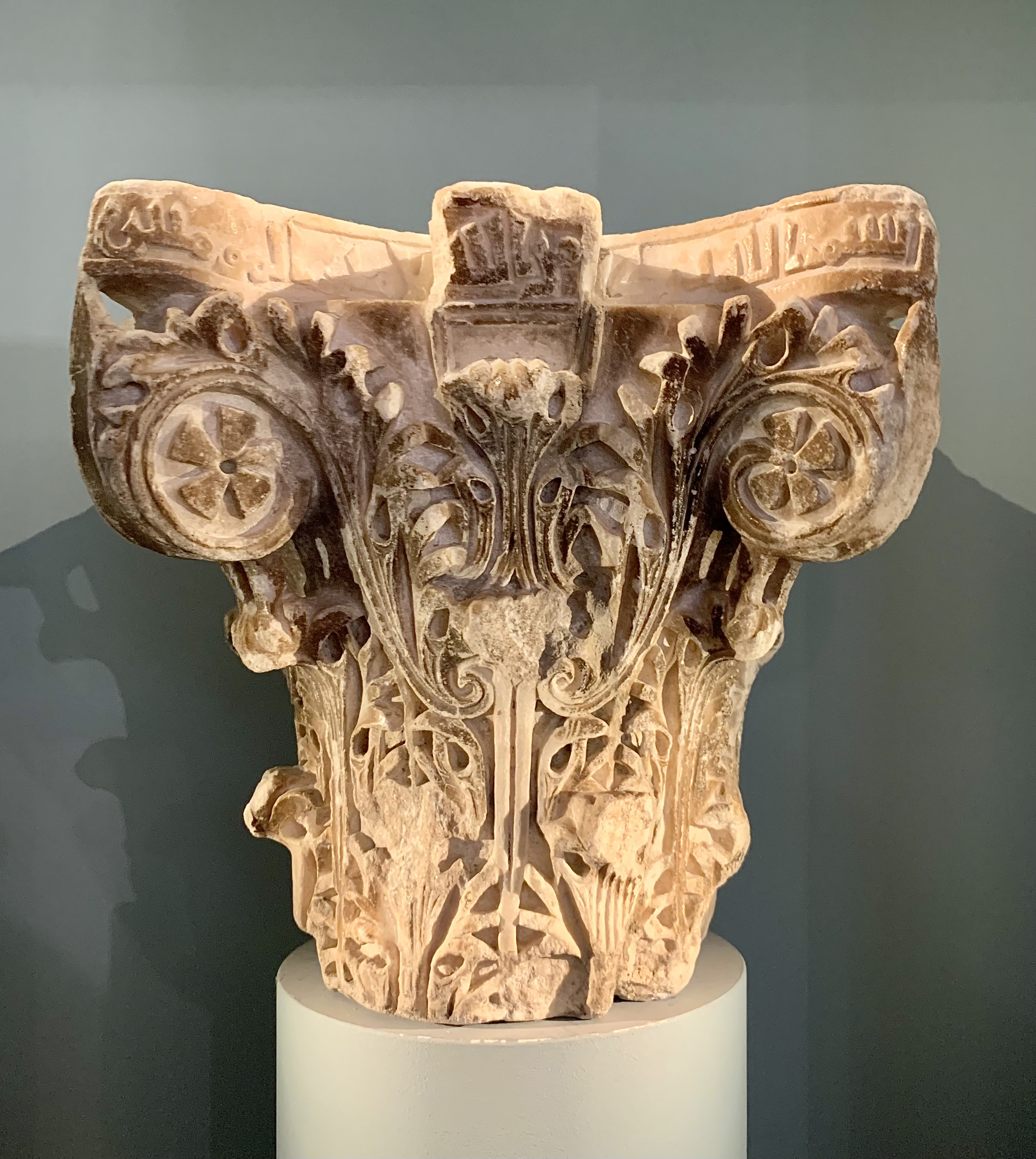
Islamic quasi-Corinthian capital from Andalusia (Madīnat az-Zahrā’), present-day Spain, mid-10th century, marble, Pergamon Museum, Berlin

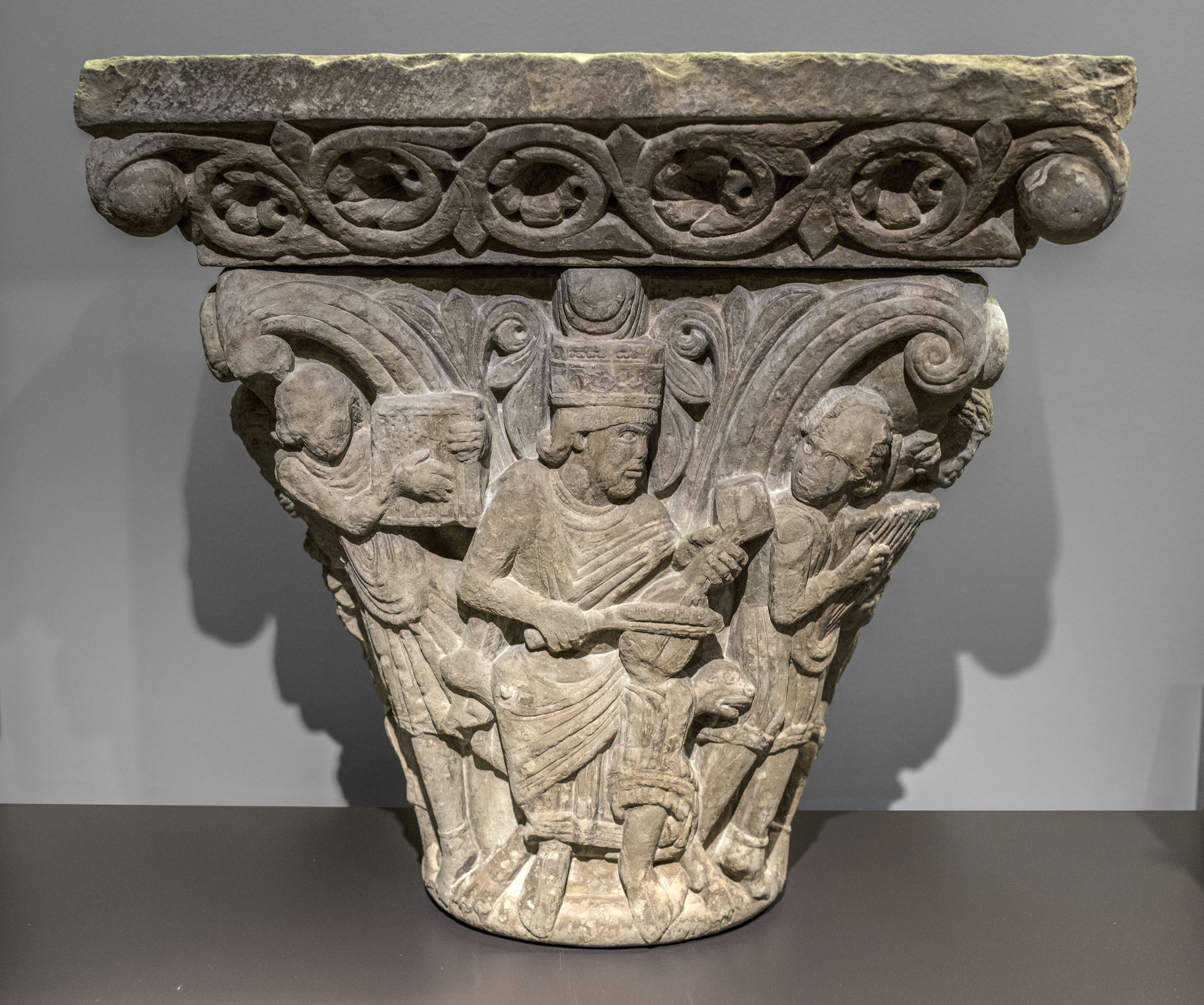
Romanesque quasi-Corinthian historiated capital showing King David and eleven musicians, from the Jaca Cathedral, Jaca, Spain, 11th-12th centuries, stone, Museo Diocesano de Jaca

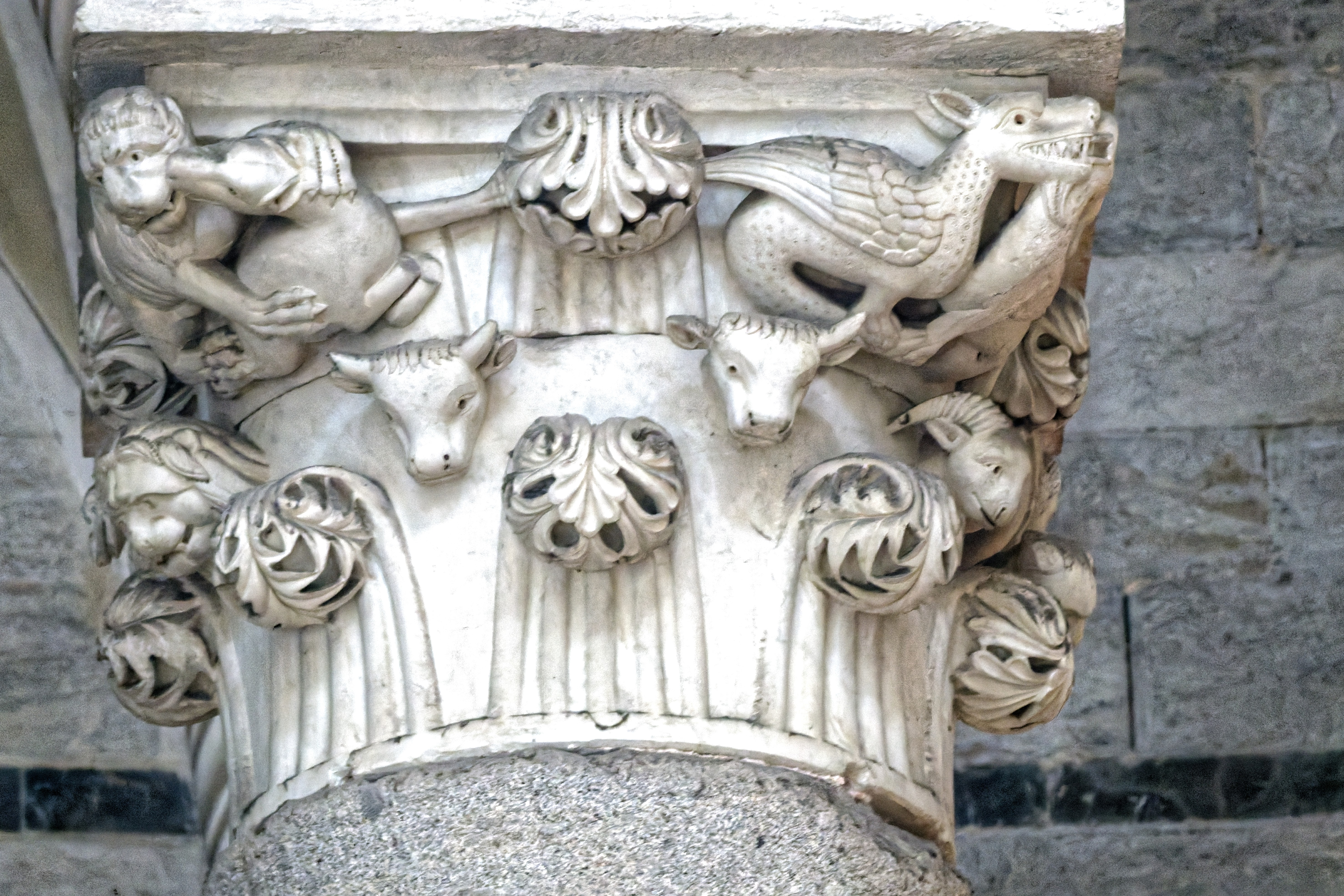
Romanesque quasi-Corinthian capital in the Pisa Baptistery, Italy, 12th century

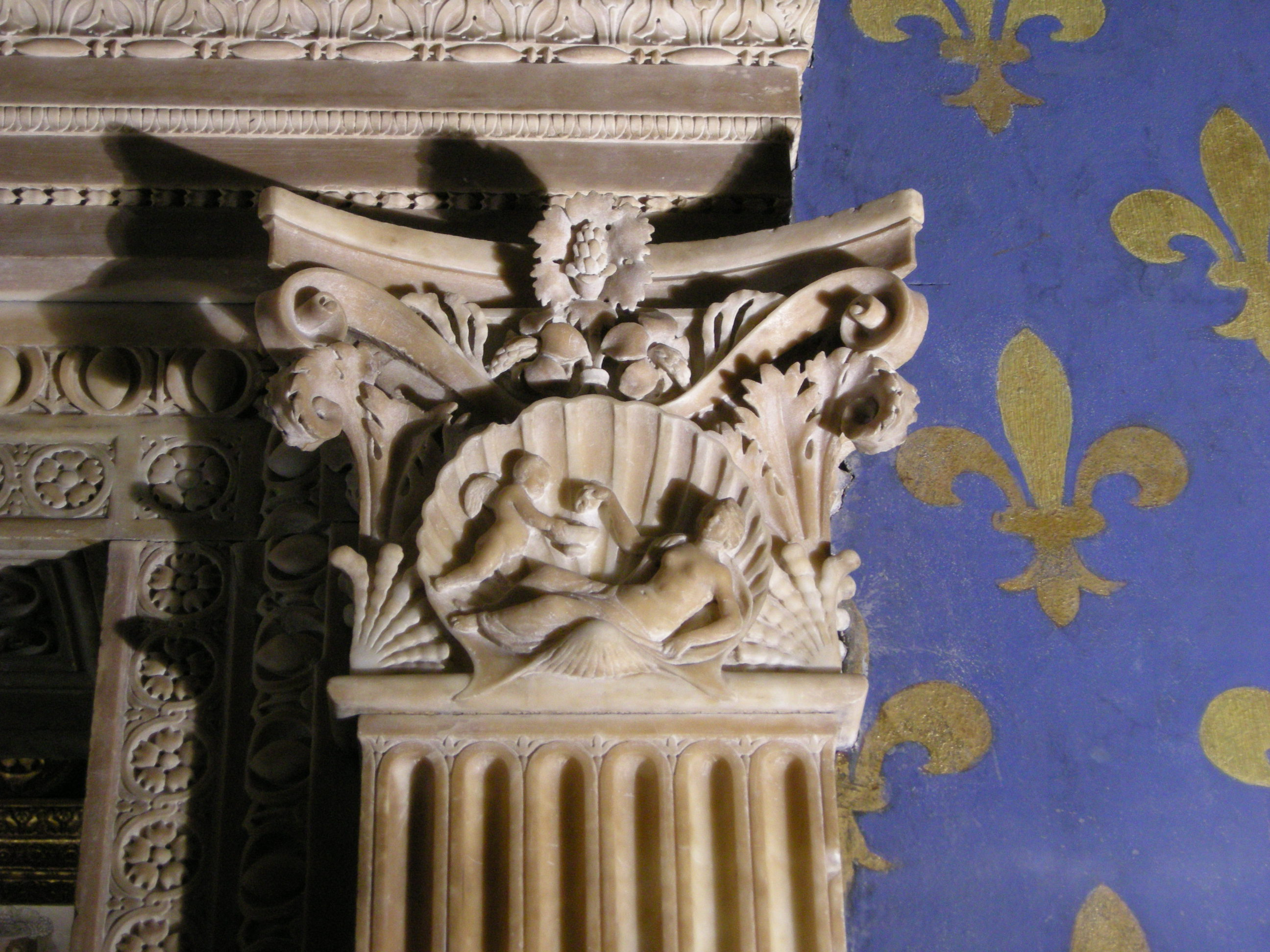
Renaissance reinterpretation of the Corinthian order, with a capital with Venus and Eros, in the Sala dei Gigli, Palazzo Vecchio, Florence, Italy, by Benedetto da Maiano, 1476–1481.

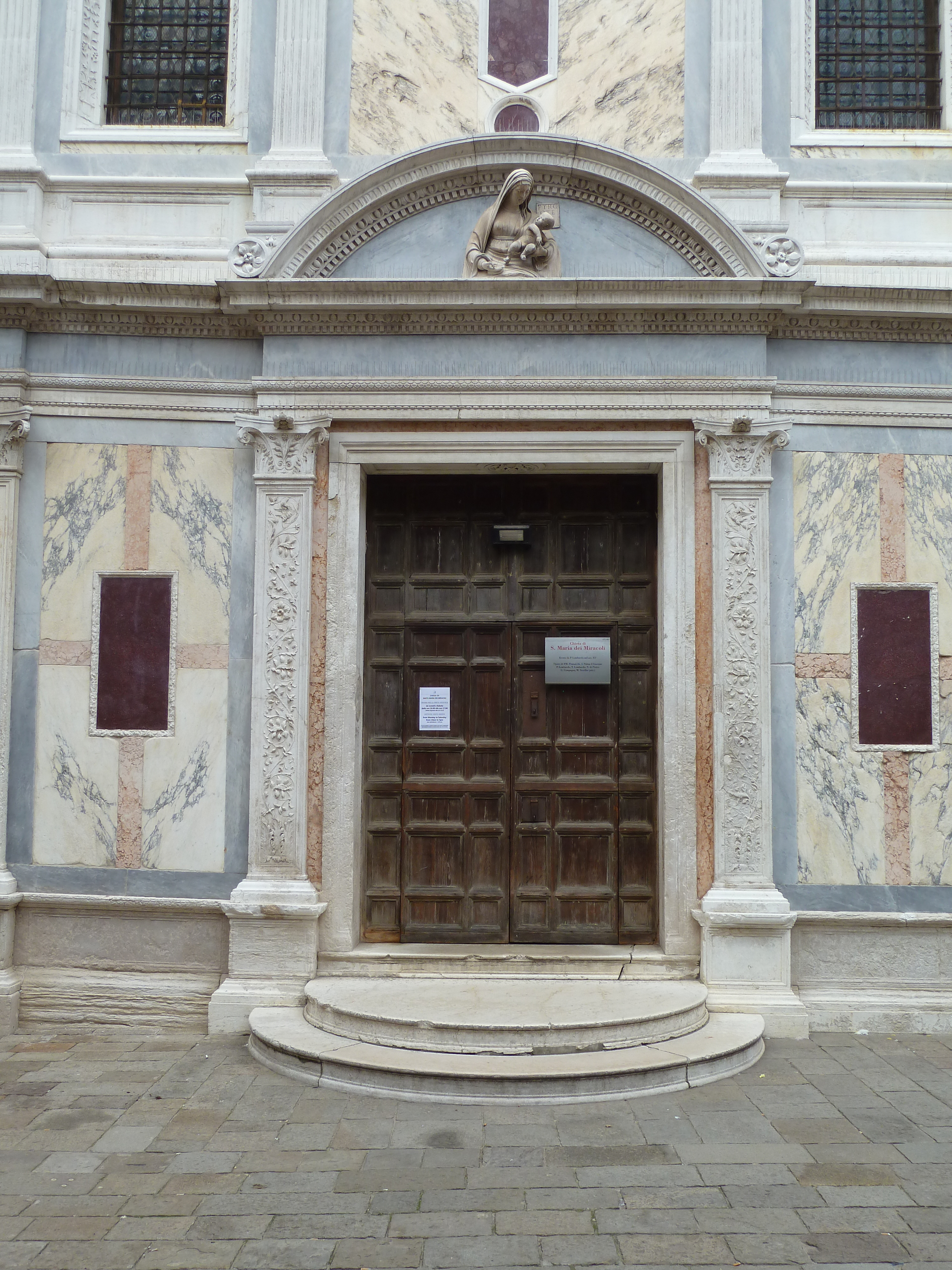
Renaissance Corinthian pilasters of the entrance of the Santa Maria dei Miracoli, Venice, by Pietro Lombardo, 1481–1489

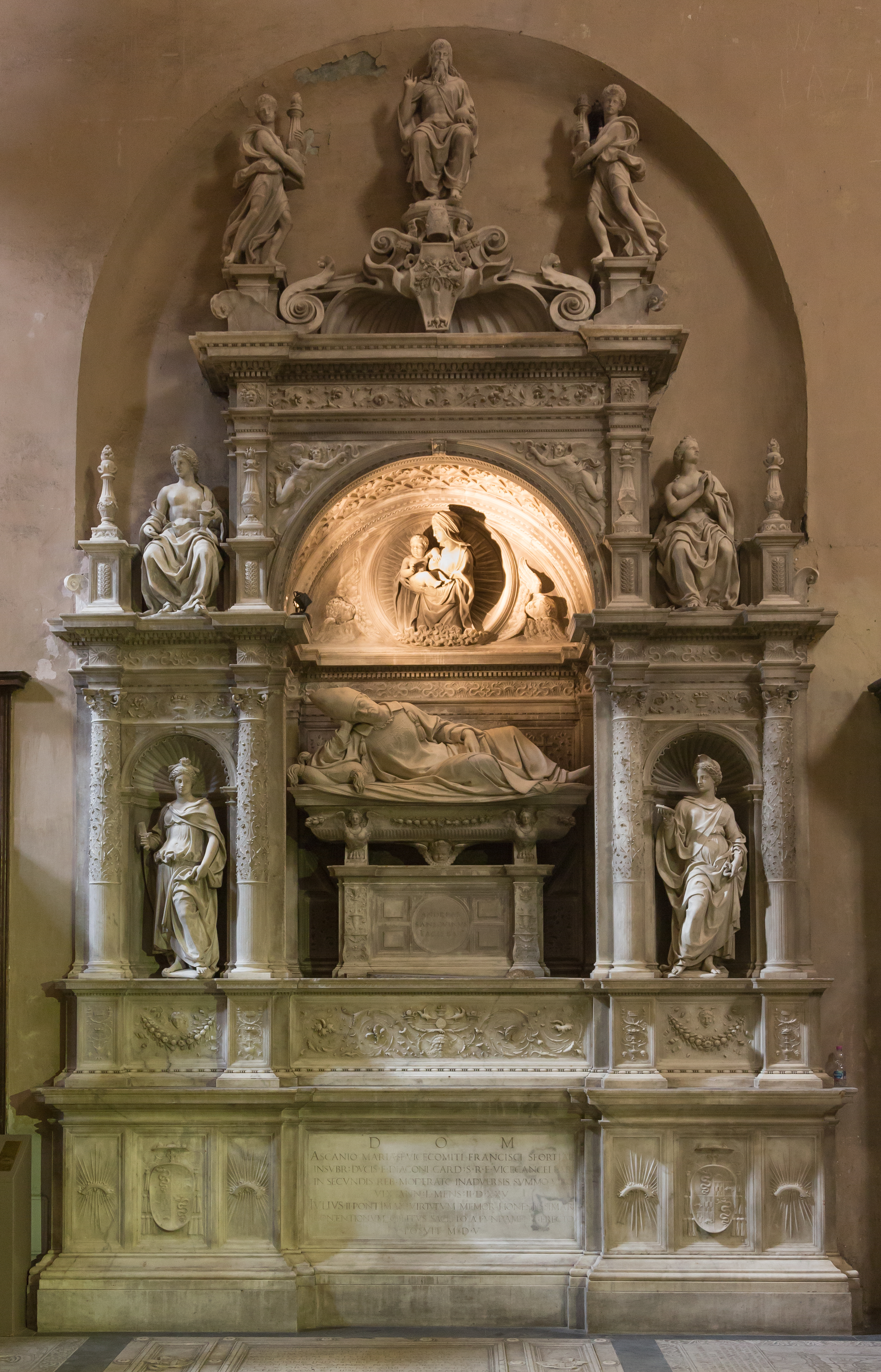
Renaissance Corinthian columns of the Tomb of Ascanio Maria Sforza, Santa Maria del Popolo, Rome, by Andrea Sansovino, c.1505

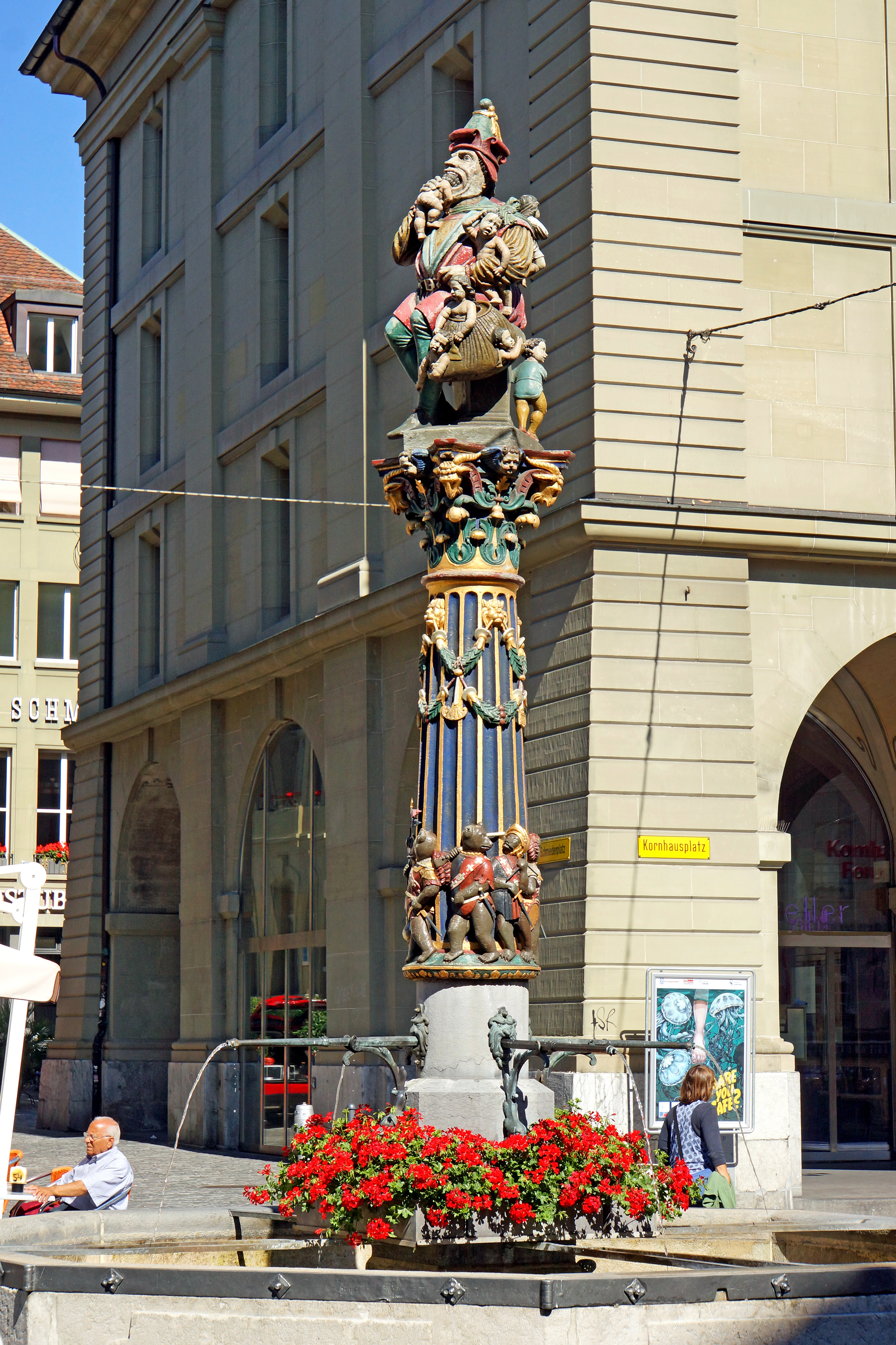
Polychrome Renaissance column of the Kindlifresserbrunnen, Bern, Switzerland, by Hans Gieng, c.1545–1546

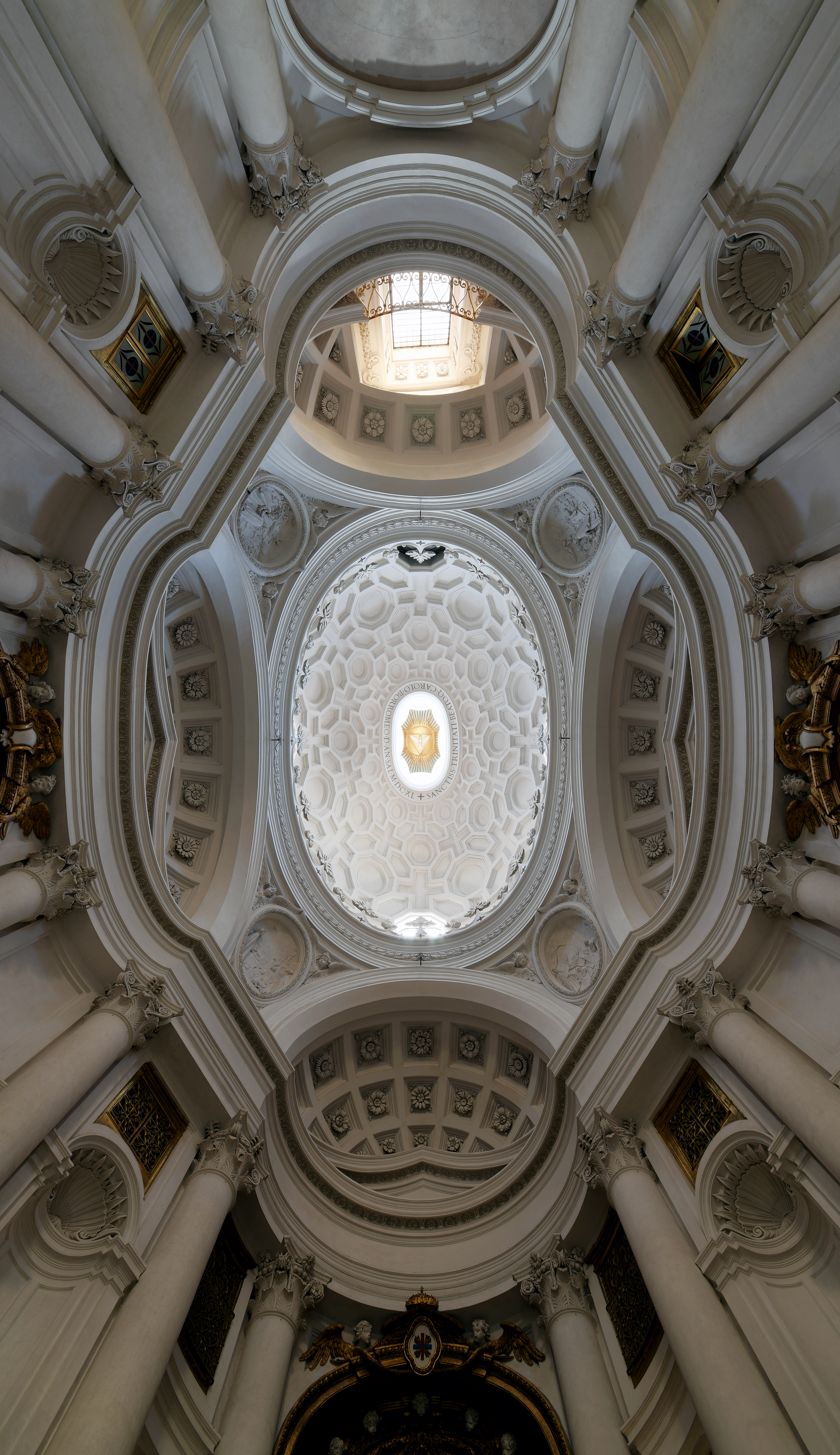
Baroque Corinthian column capitals in the San Carlo alle Quattro Fontane, Rome, by Francesco Borromini, 1638–1677

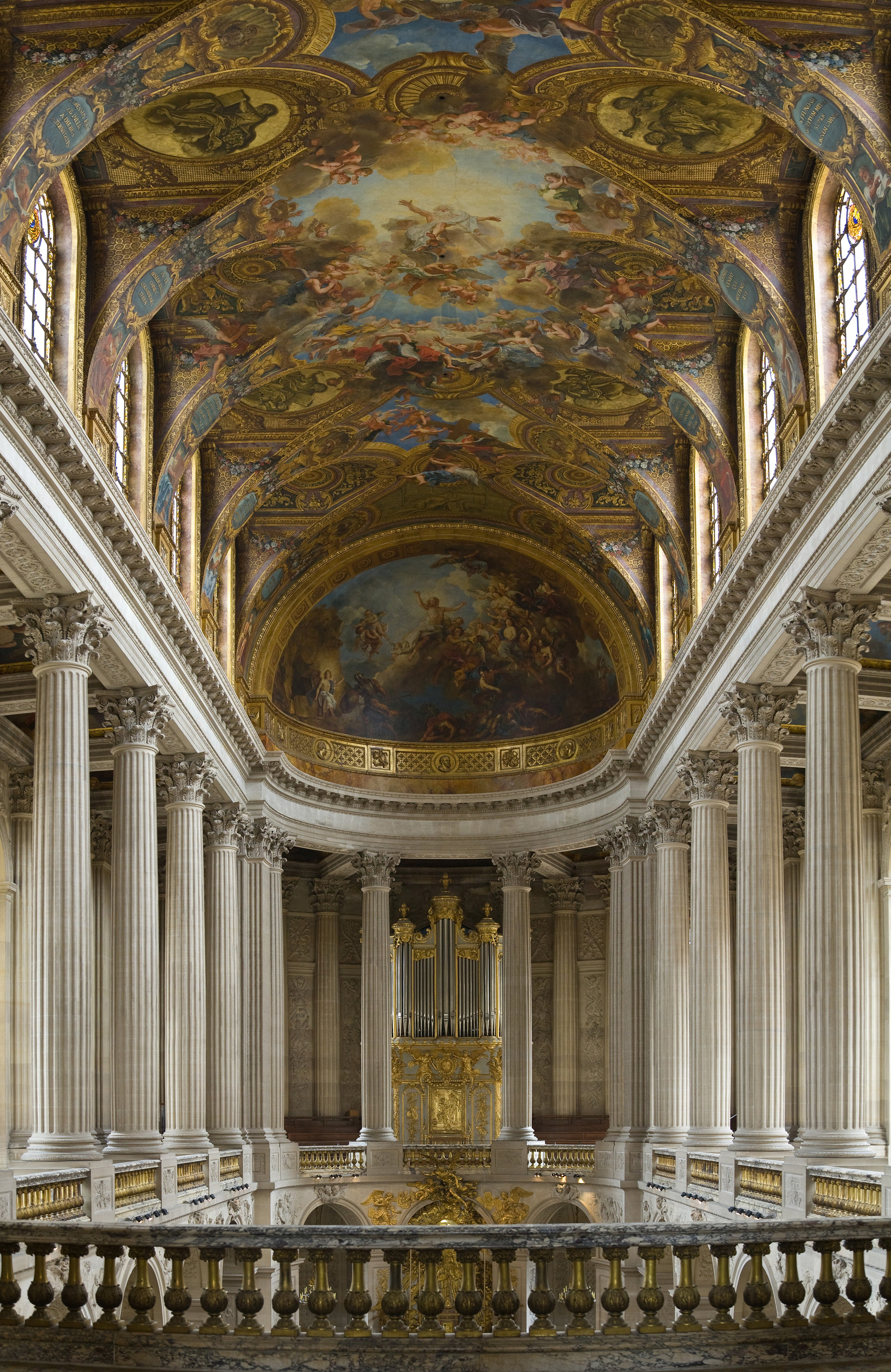
Baroque Corinthian columns in the Chapel of the Palace of Versailles, 1696–1710

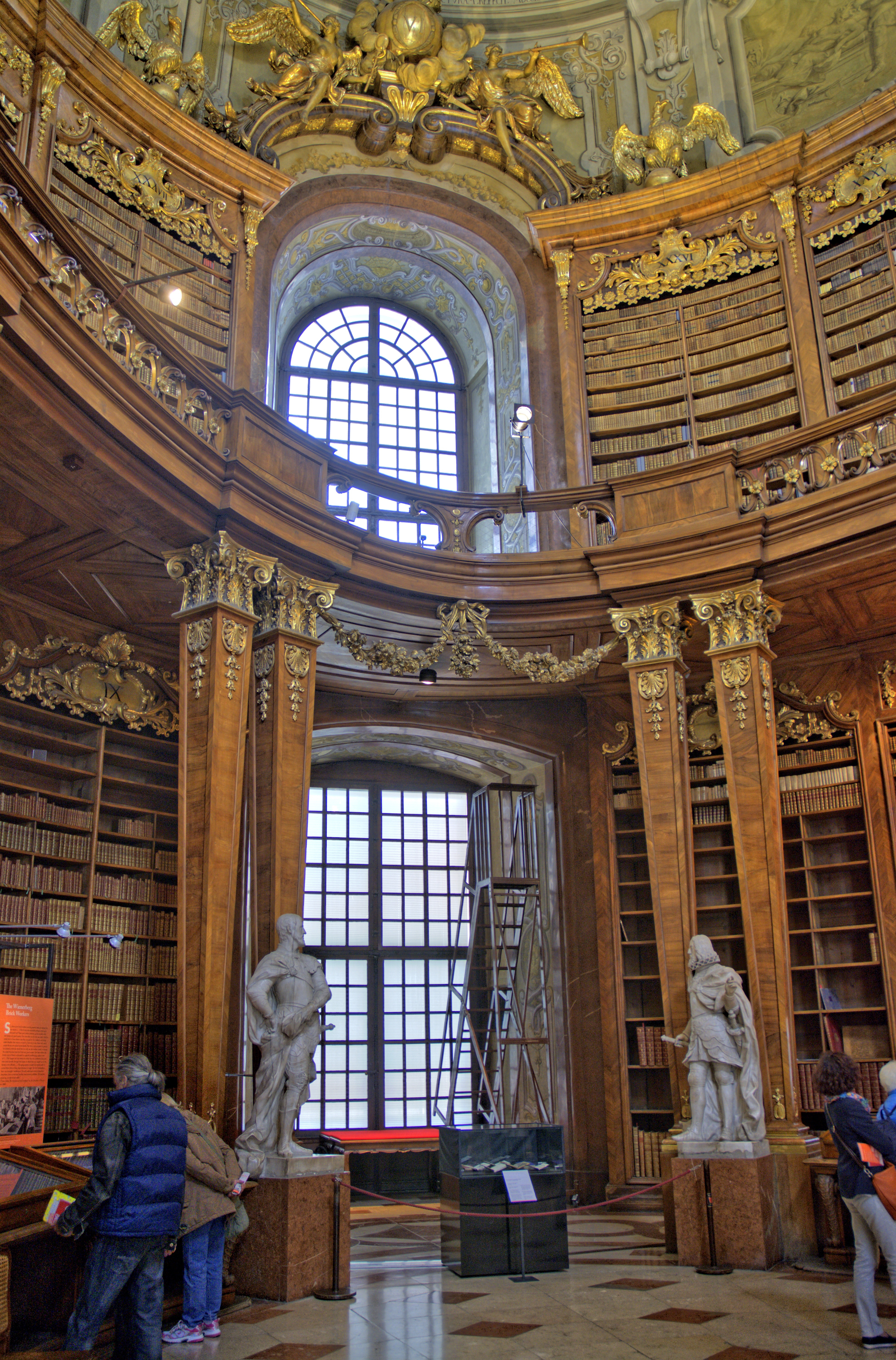
Stylized Baroque Corinthian columns in the Austrian National Library, Hofburg, Vienna, Austria, designed by Johann Bernhard Fischer von Erlach in c.1716–1720, built in 1723–1726

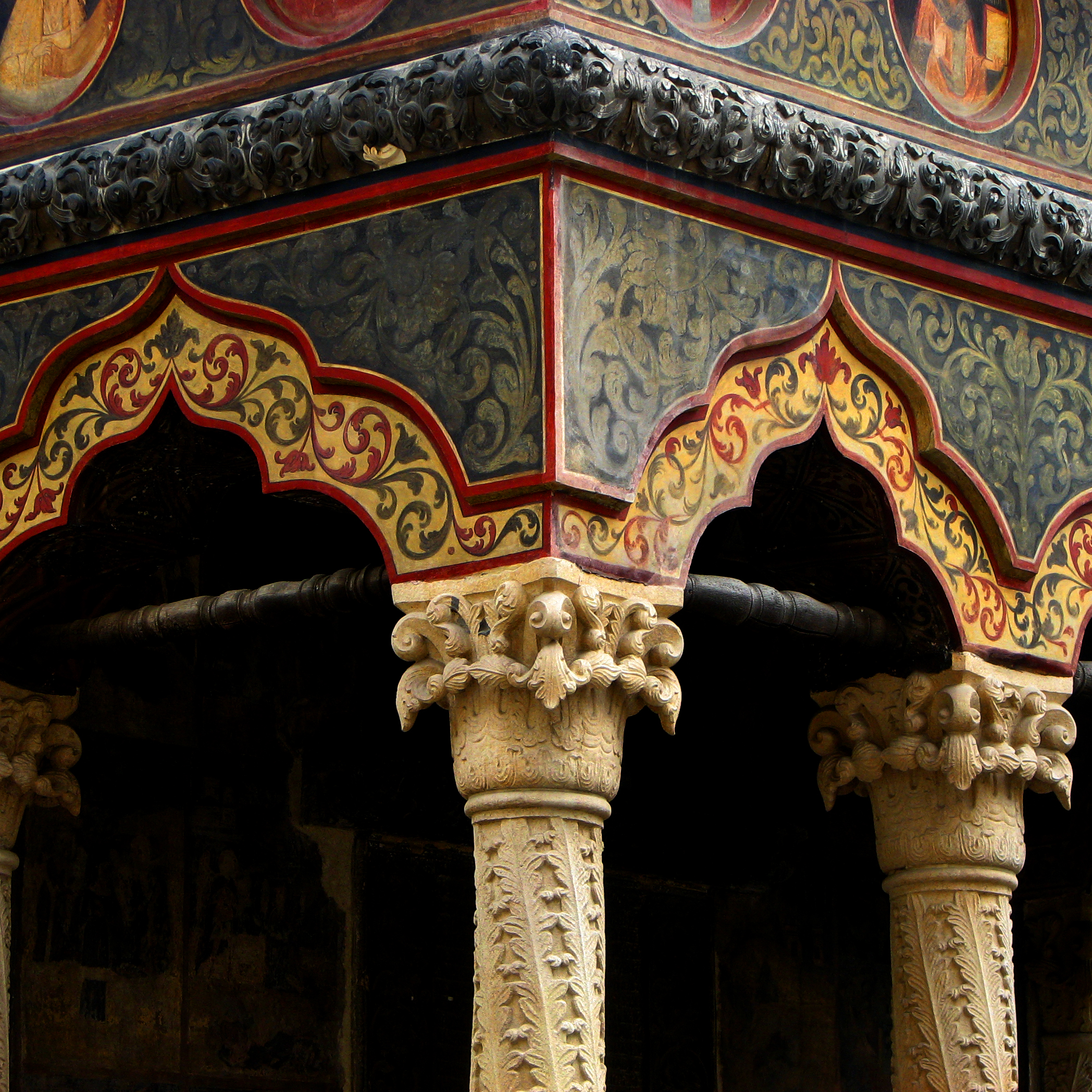
Brâncovenesc quasi-Corinthian capitals of the Stavropoleos Monastery Church, Bucharest, Romania, unknown architect, 1724

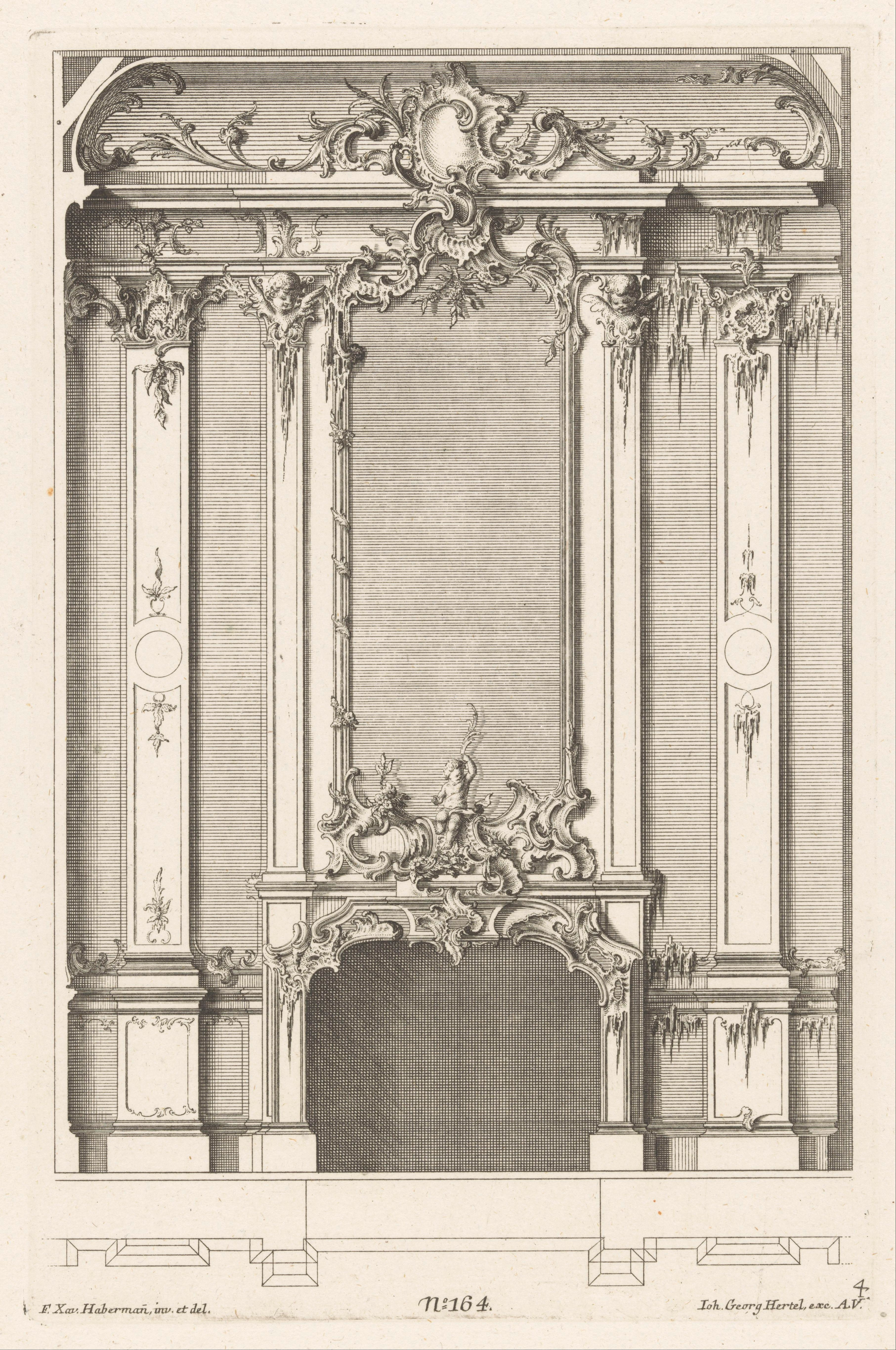
Rococo reinterpretations of the Corinthian order in a design for an interior, by Franz Xaver Habermann, 1731–1775, etching on paper, Rijksmuseum, Amsterdam, the Netherlands

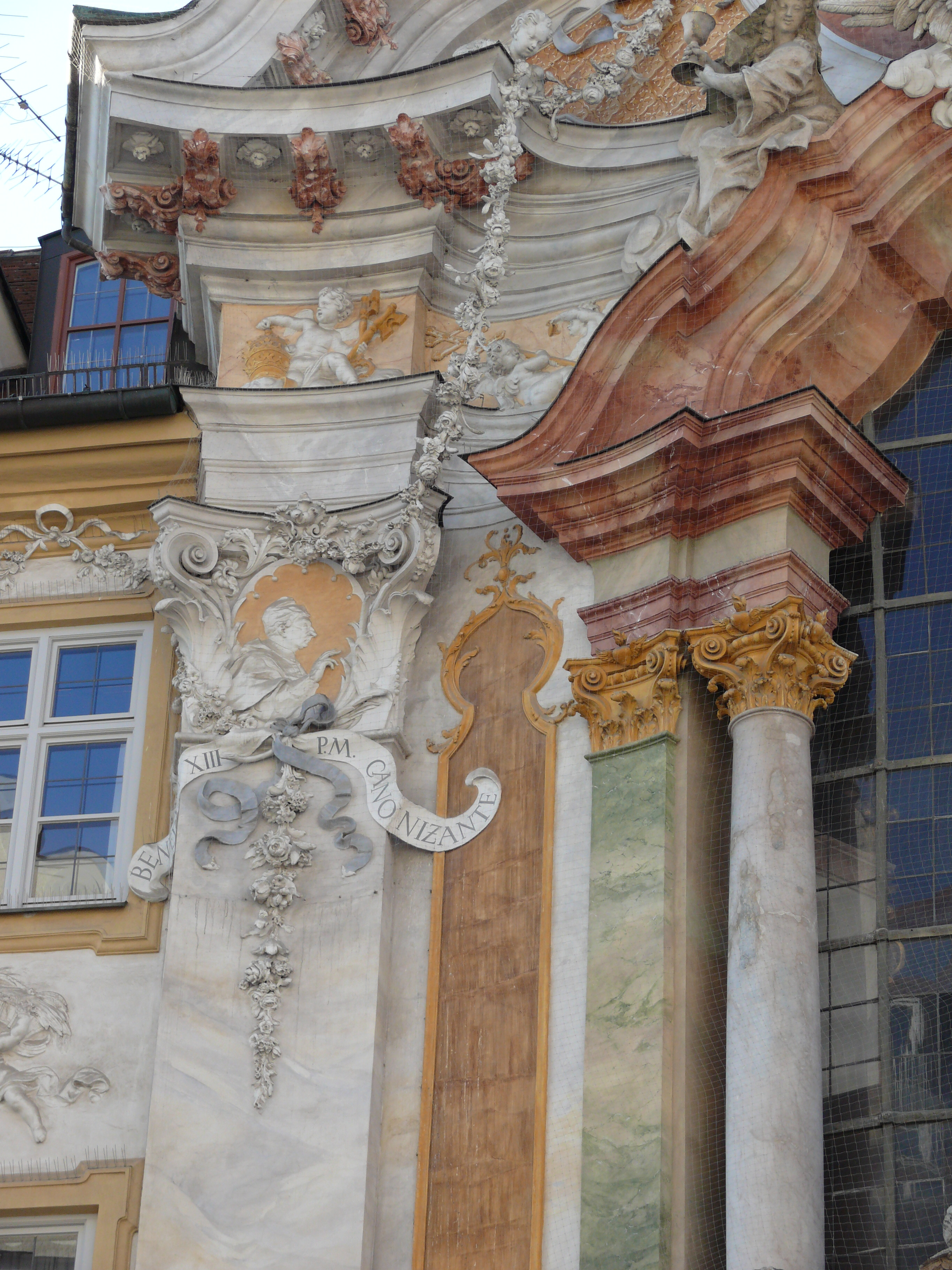
Creative rococo reinterpretations of the Corinthian capital on the facade of the Asam Church, Munich, Germany, by Egid Quirin Asam and Cosmas Damian Asam, 1733–1746

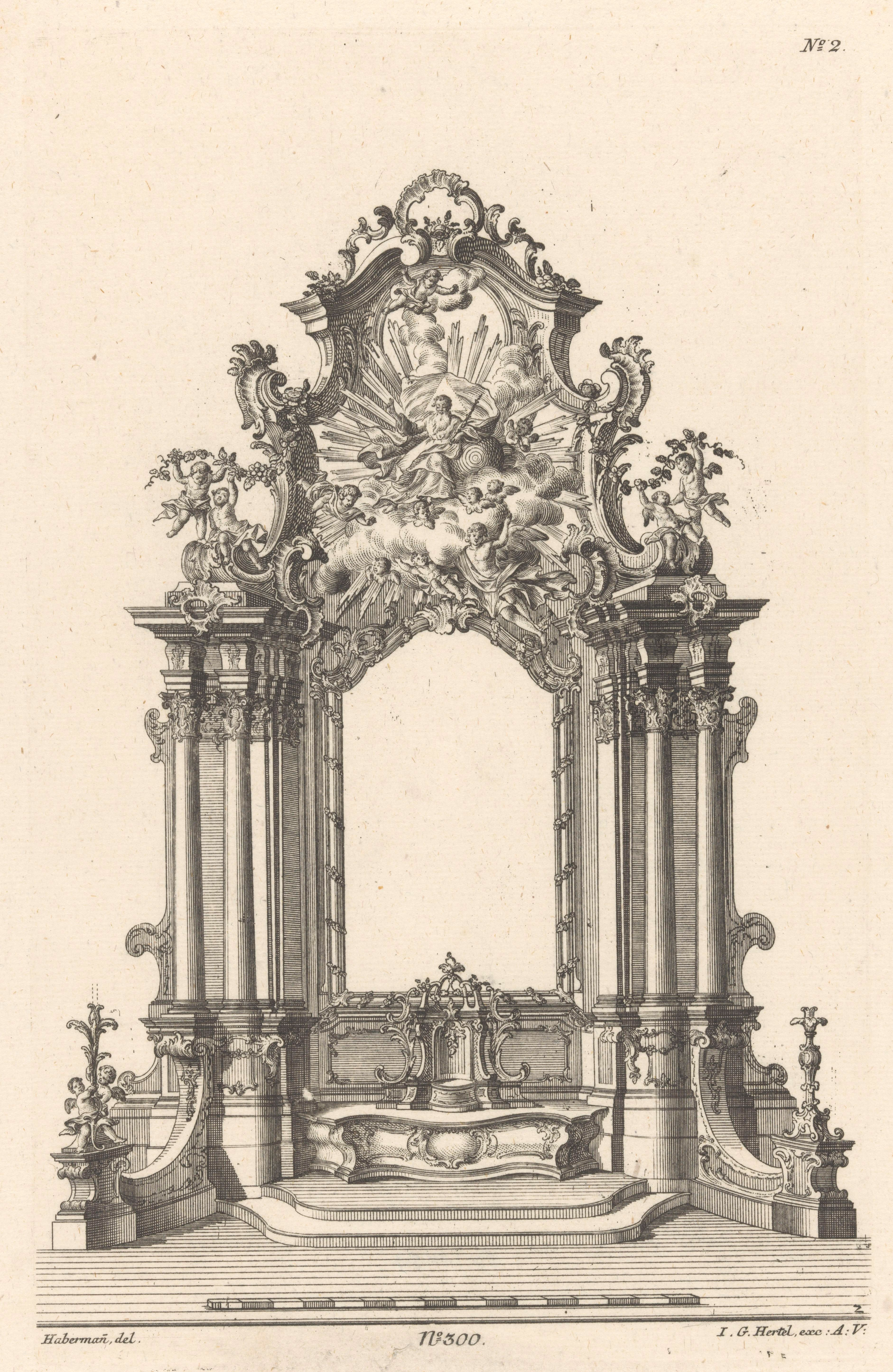
Rococo reinterpretations of the Corinthian order in an altar design, with asymmetric capitals and more sinuous S-shaped acanthuses, by Franz Xaver Habermann, 1740–1745, etching on paper, Rijksmuseum

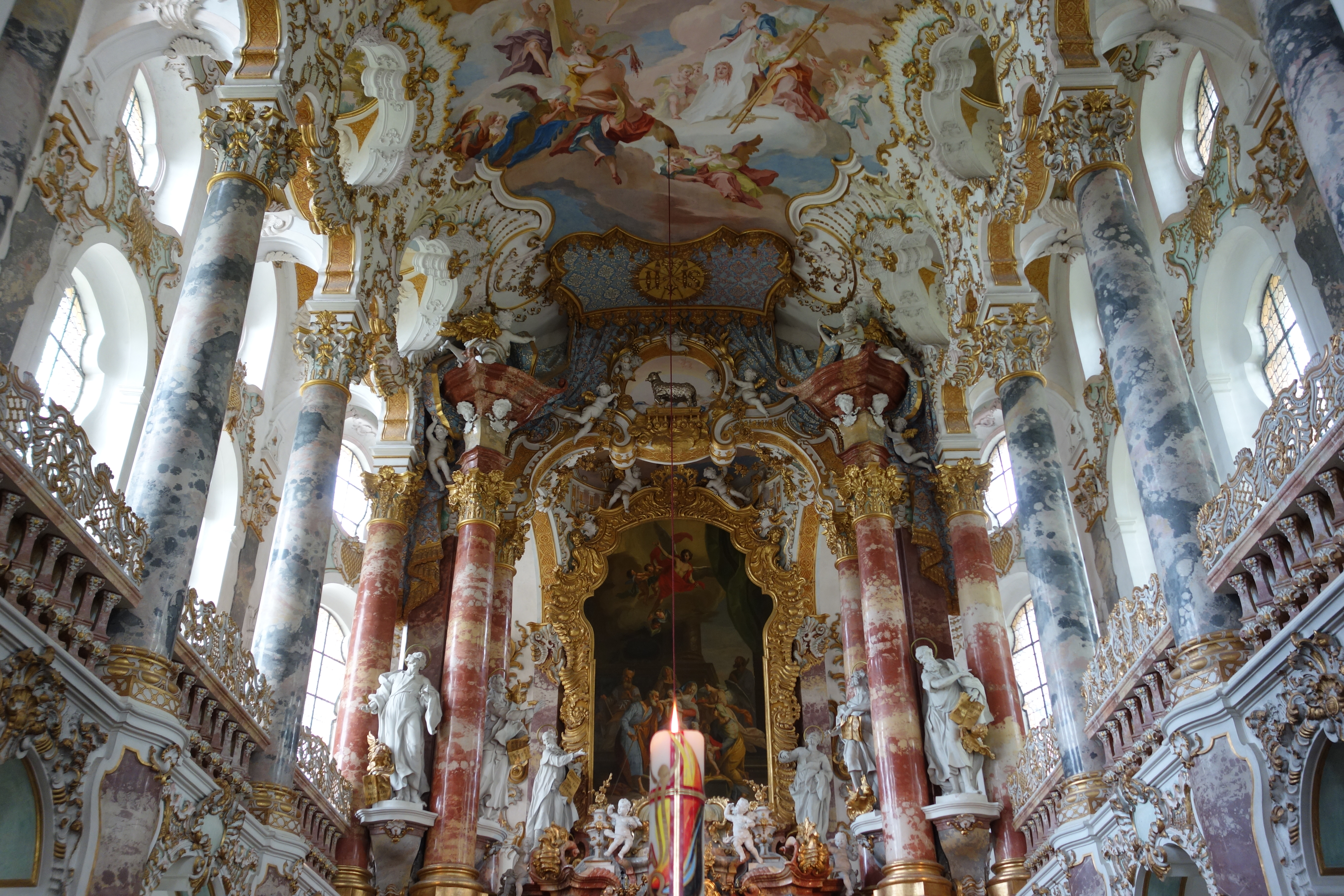
Rococo reinterpretations of the Corinthian order in the Pilgrimage Church of Wies, Steingaden, Germany, by Dominikus and Johann Baptist Zimmermann, 1746–1754

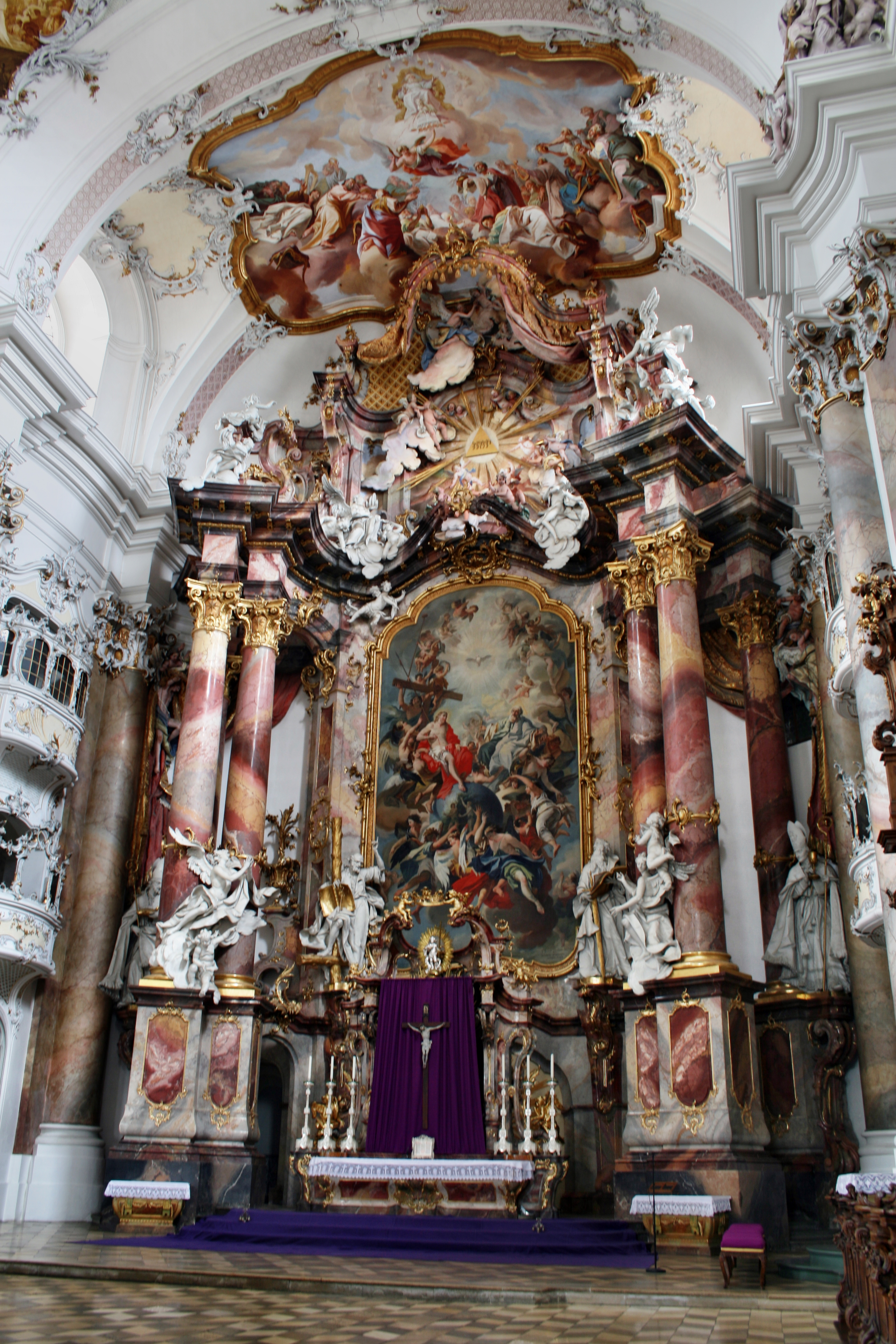
Rococo reinterpretations of the Corinthian order at the high altar in the abbey church of Ottobeuren, Germany, by Johann Michael Fischer, 1748–1754

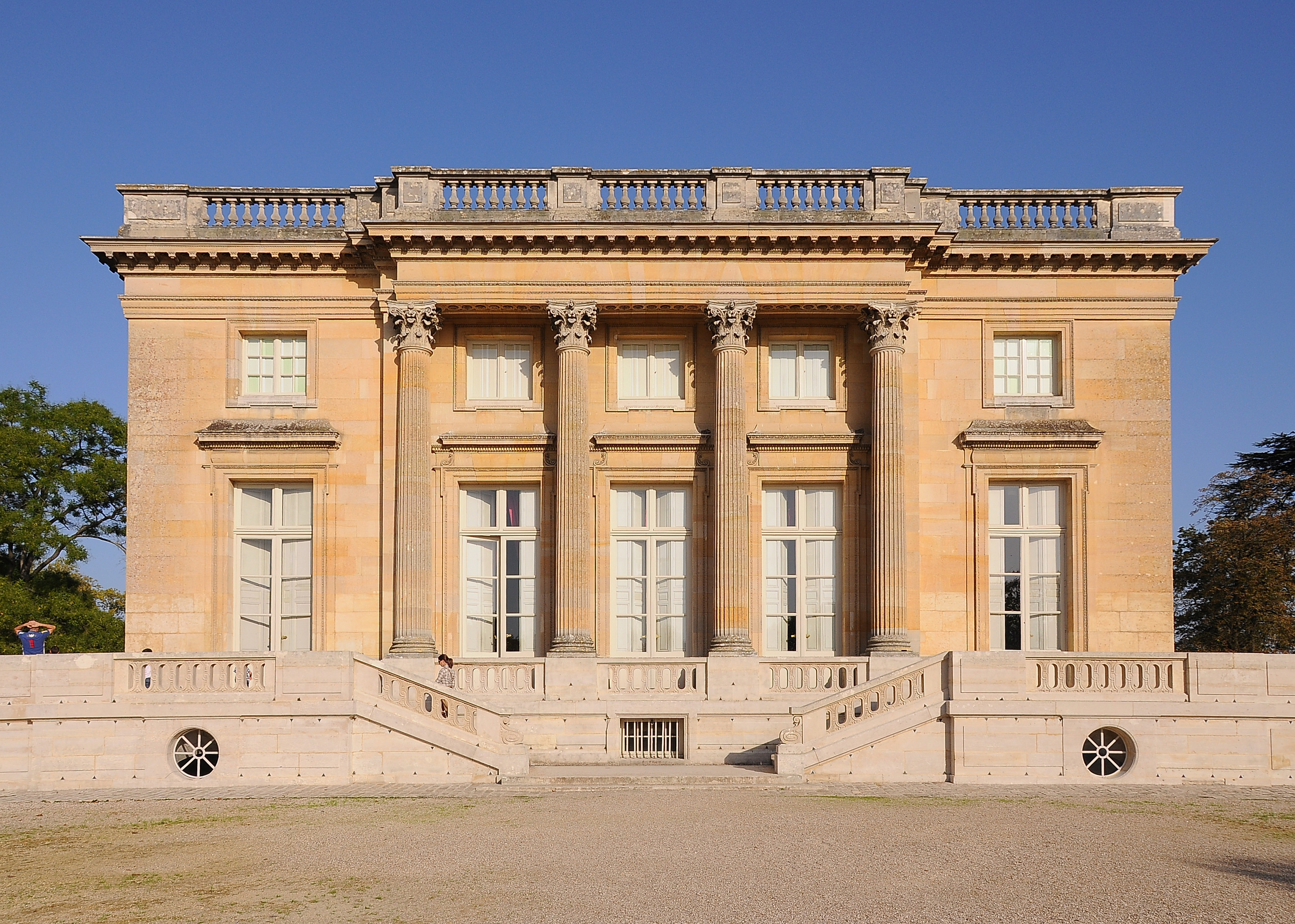
Neoclassical Corinthian columns on the Petit Trianon, Versailles, by Ange-Jacques Gabriel, 1764

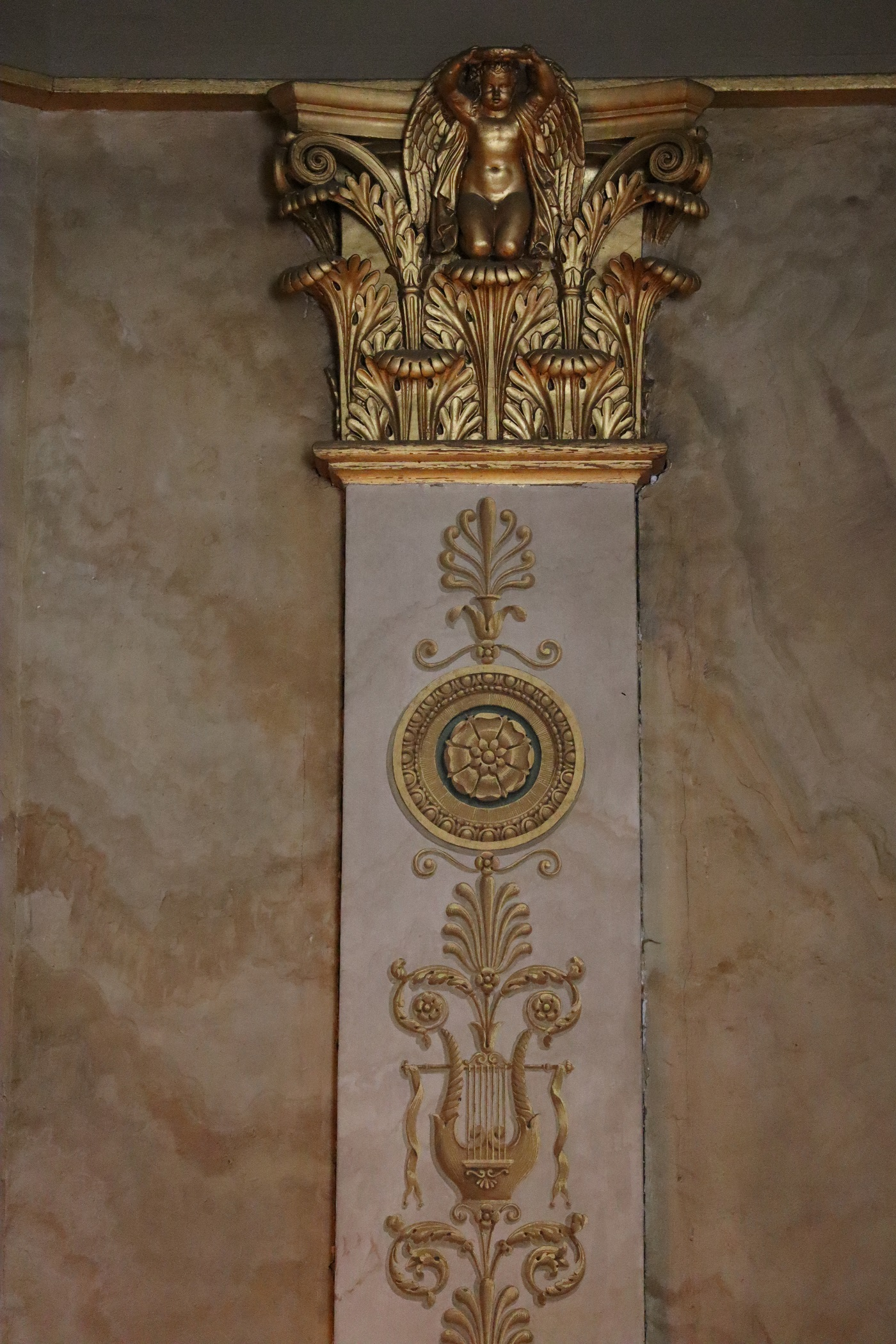
Neoclassical Corinthian pilaster in the Salon des dames d'honneur, Château de Compiègne, Compiègne, France, unknown architect, c.1810

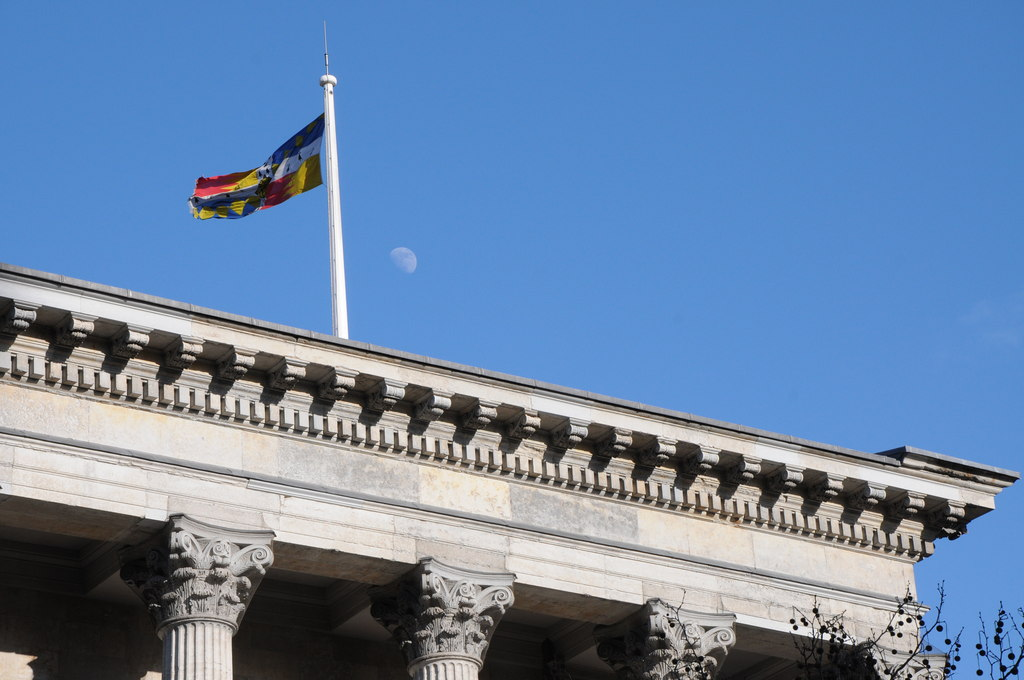
Neoclassical Corinthian capitals of the Birmingham Town Hall, Birmingham, UK, inspired by those of the Temple of Castor and Pollux in Rome, by Joseph Hansom and Edward Welch, 1834

Greek Revival Corinthian columns of the Sturdivant Hall, Selma, Alabama, US, inspired by those of the Tower of the Winds, by Thomas Helm Lee, 1852–1856

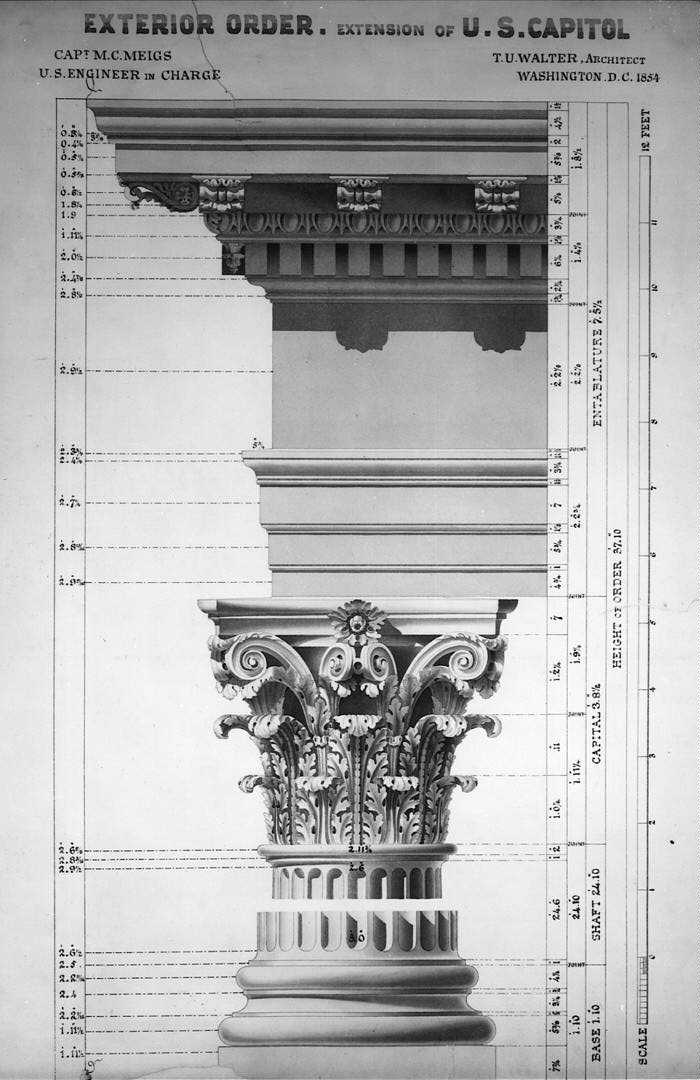
The Neoclassical Corinthian order as used in extending the United States Capitol in 1854: the column's shaft has been omitted

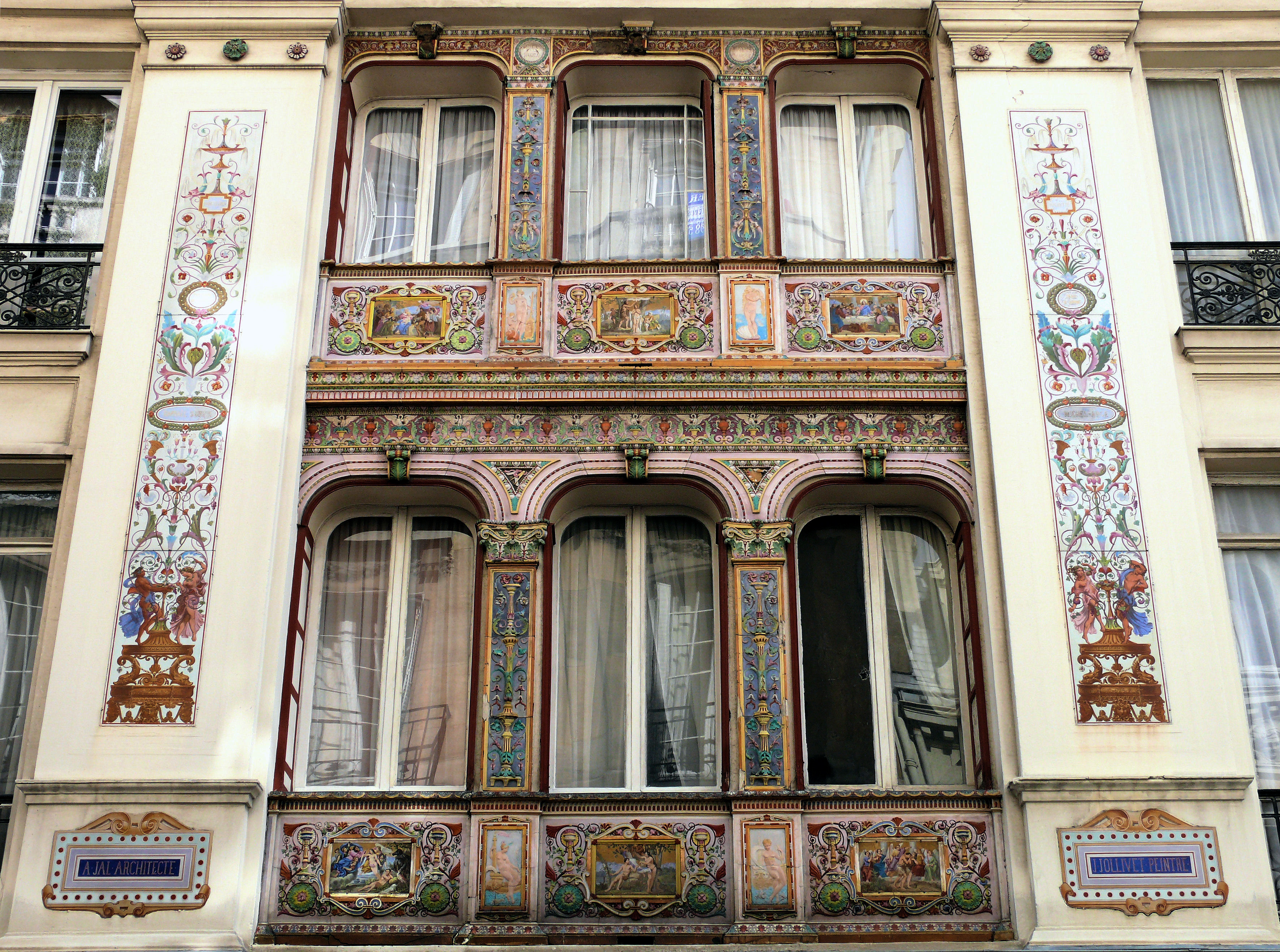
Renaissance Revival polychrome ceramic Corinthian pilasters of Cité Malesherbes no. 11 (lower story), Paris, architect Antoine Anatole Jal and painter Pierre-Jules Jollivet, 1858

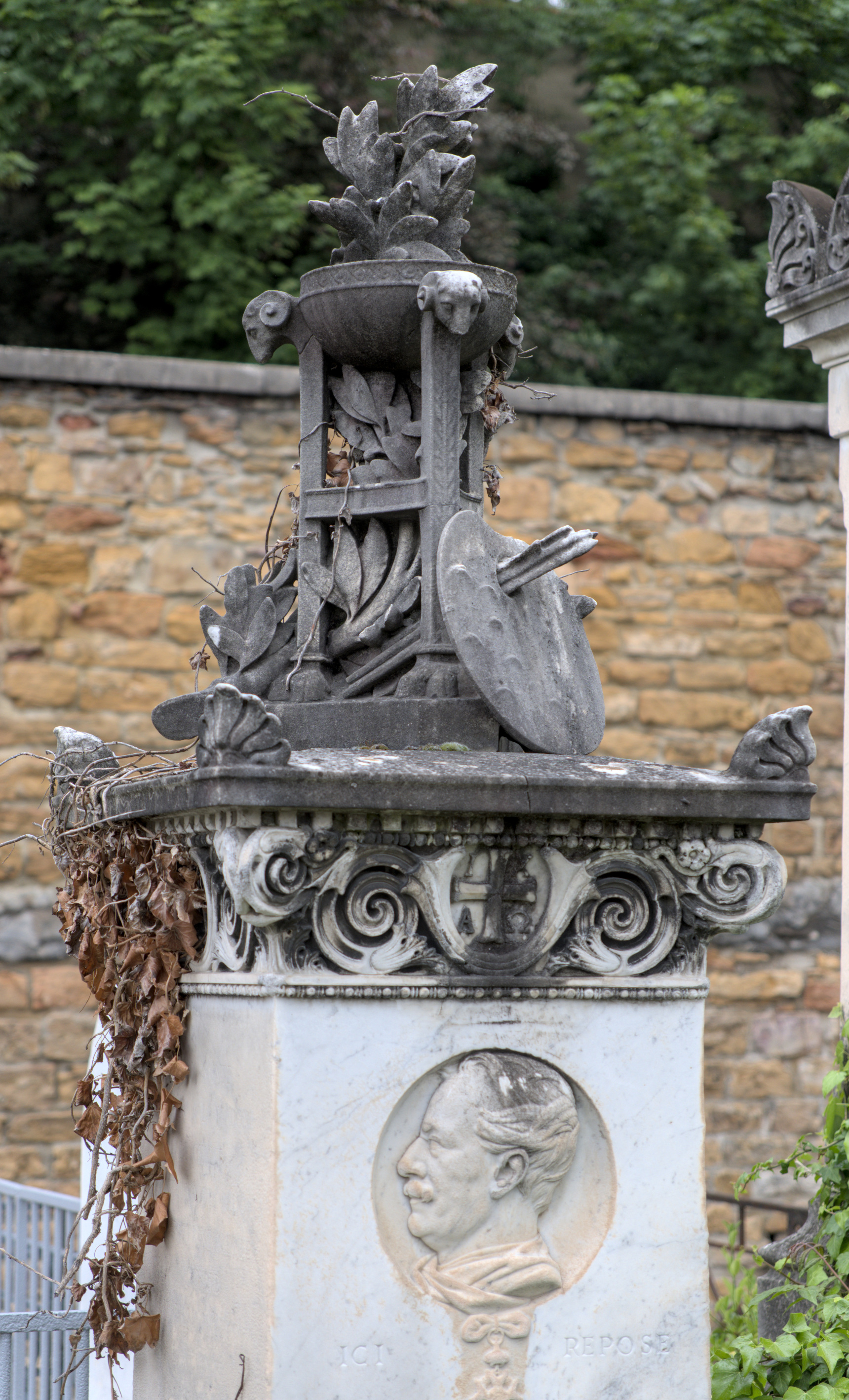
Neoclassical reinterpretation of the Corinthian capital at the Grave of Claude Bonnefond, Loyasse Cemetery, Lyon, France, designed by Antoine-Marie Chenavard and sculpted by Guillaume Bonnet, c.1860

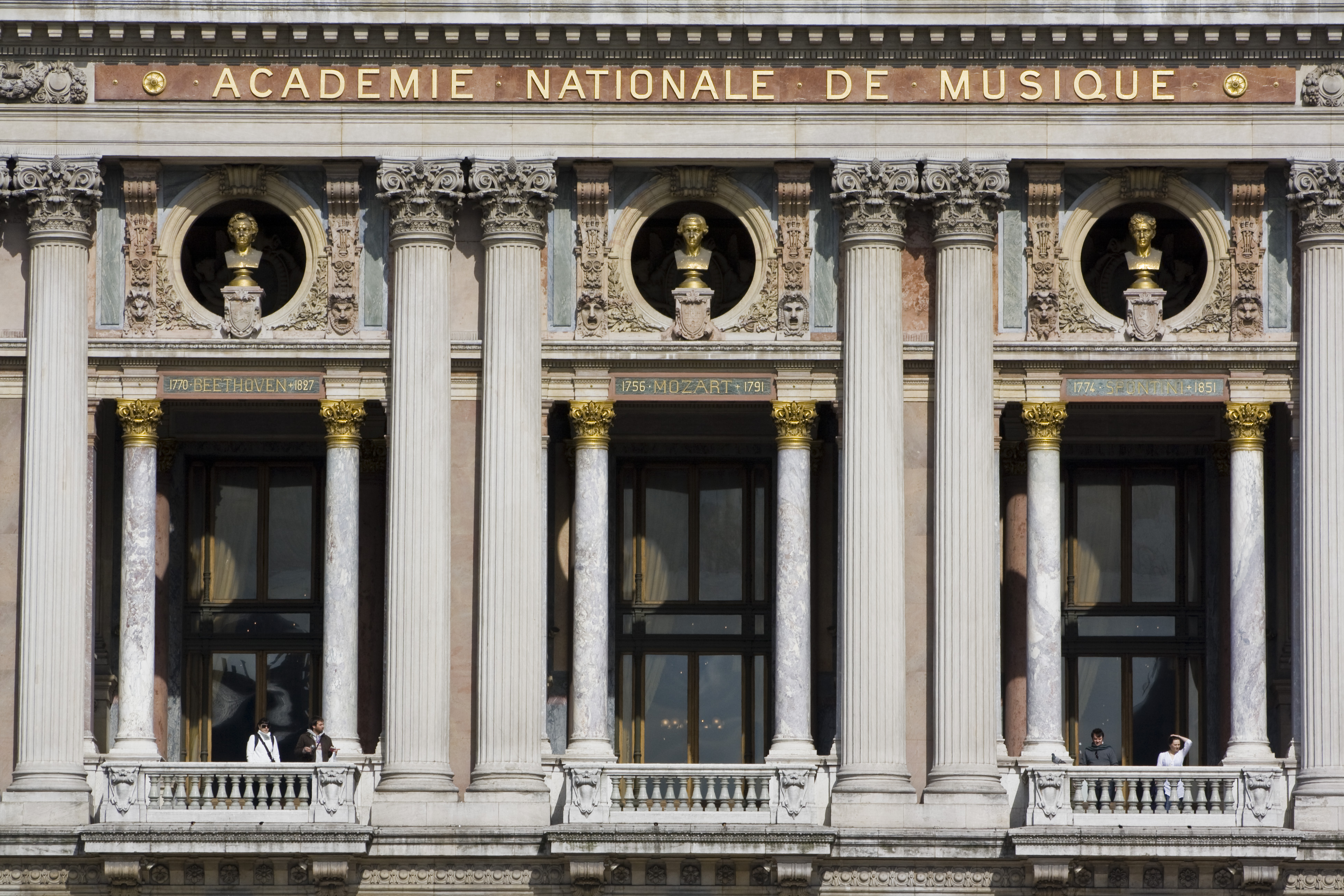
Beaux Arts Corinthian columns on the facade of the Palais Garnier, Paris, by Charles Garnier, 1861–1874

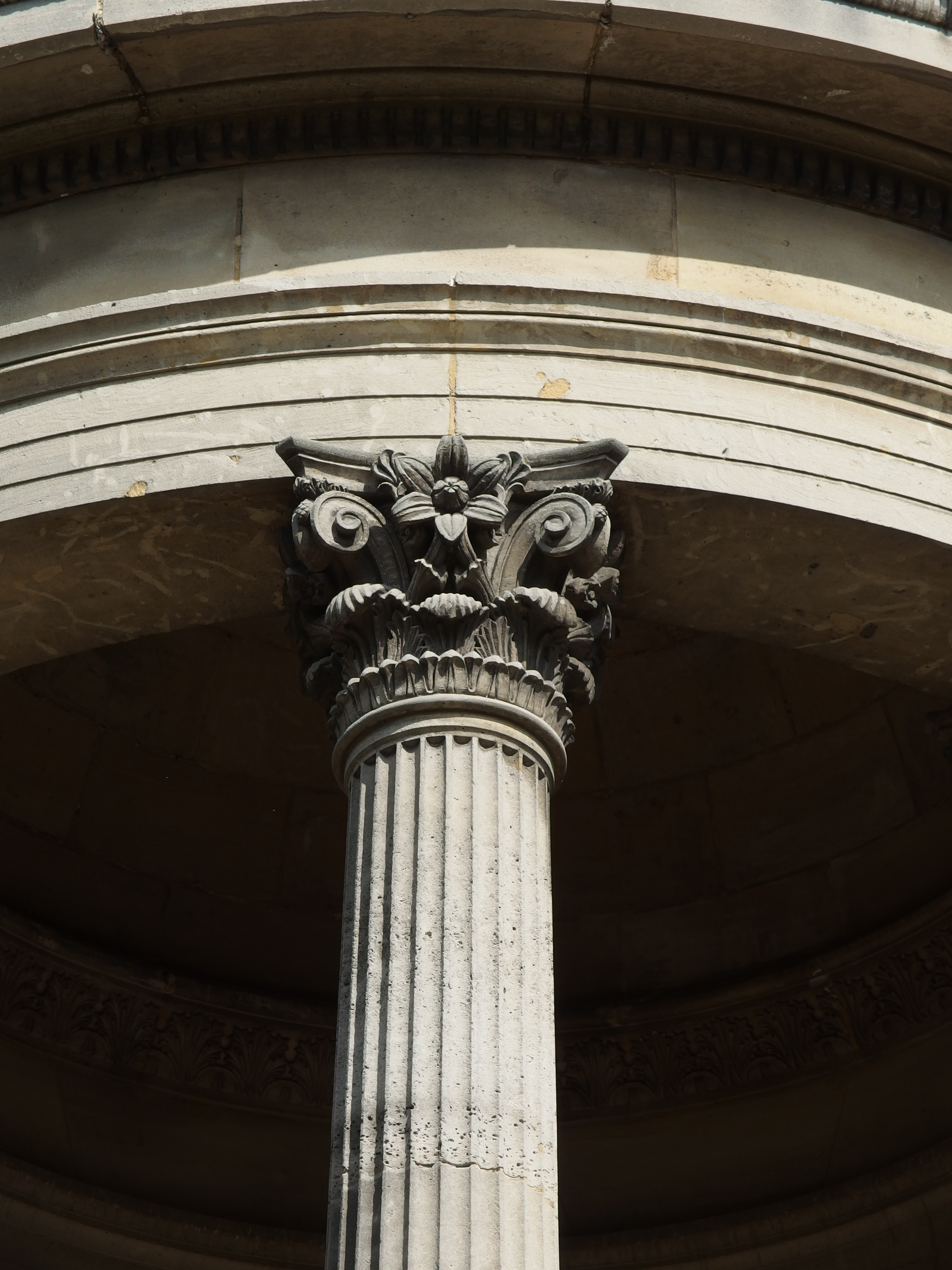
Neoclassical Corinthian capital of the Temple de la Sibylle, Parc des Buttes Chaumont, Paris, heavily inspired by those of the Temple of Vesta in Tivoli, by Gabriel Davioud, 1866

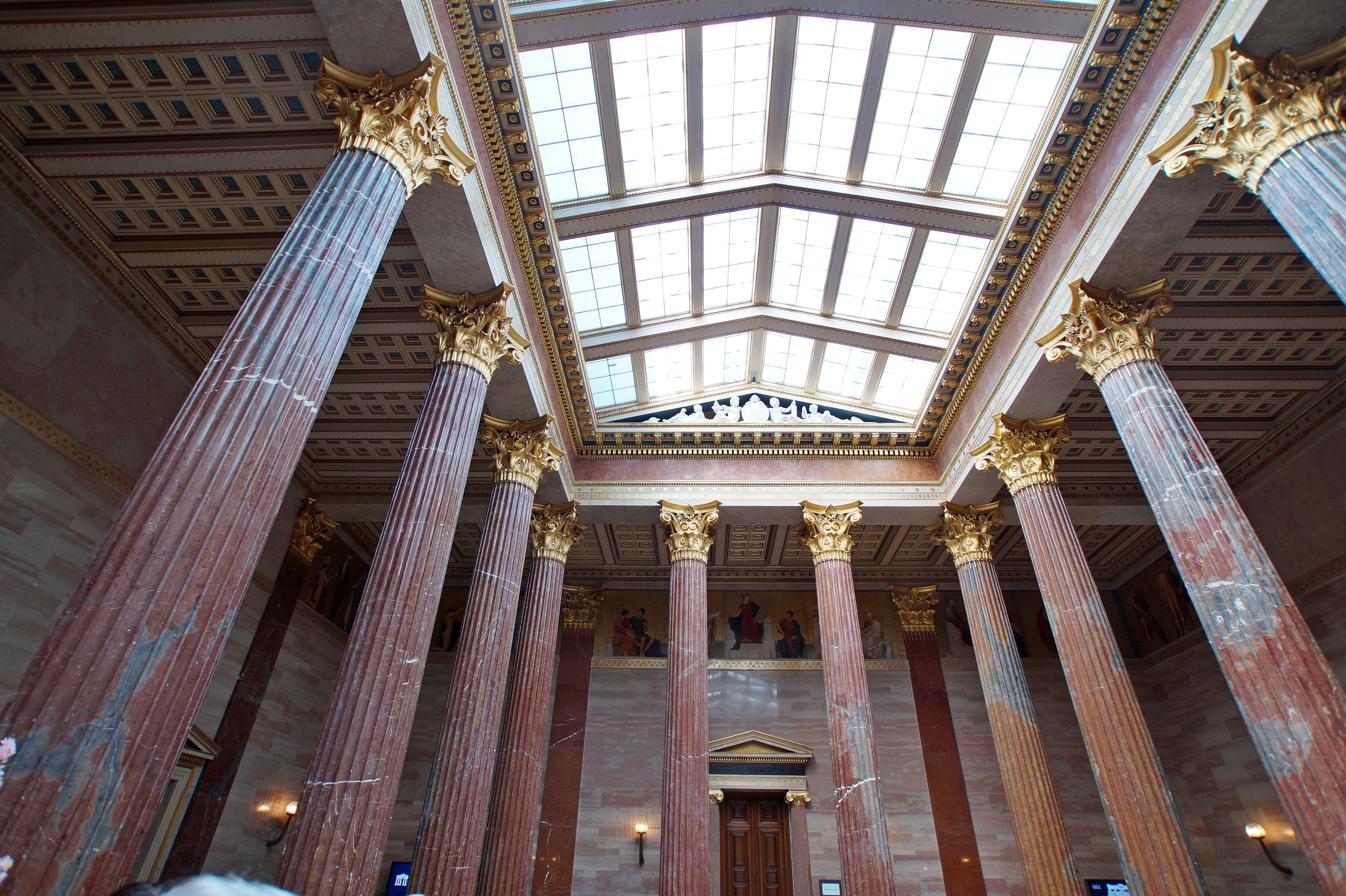
Greek Revival Corinthian columns in the Austrian Parliament Building, Vienna, inspired by those of the Choragic Monument of Lysicrates, by Theophil von Hansen, 1873–1883

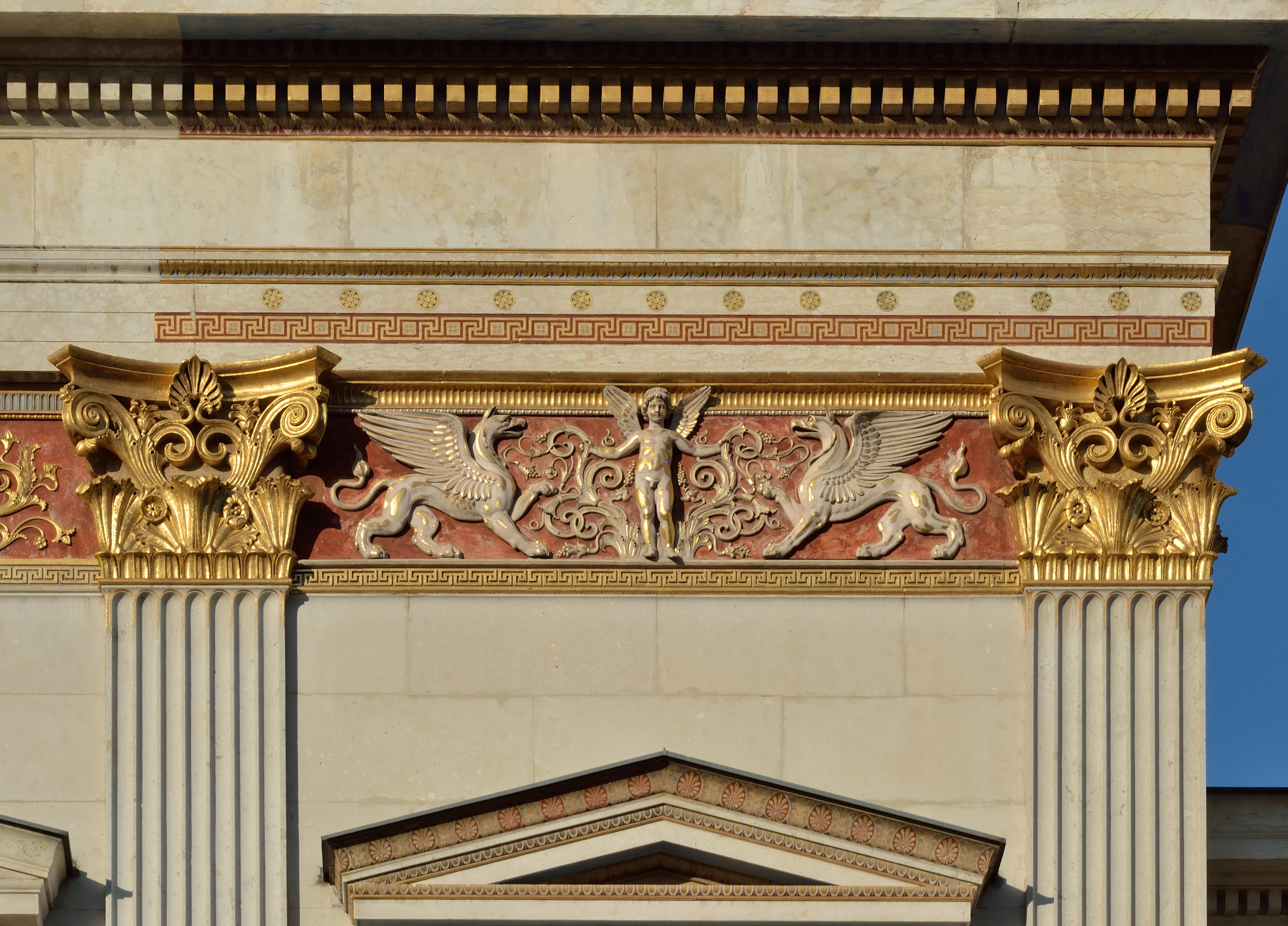
Greek Revival pilaster capitals on the facade of the Austrian Parliament Building

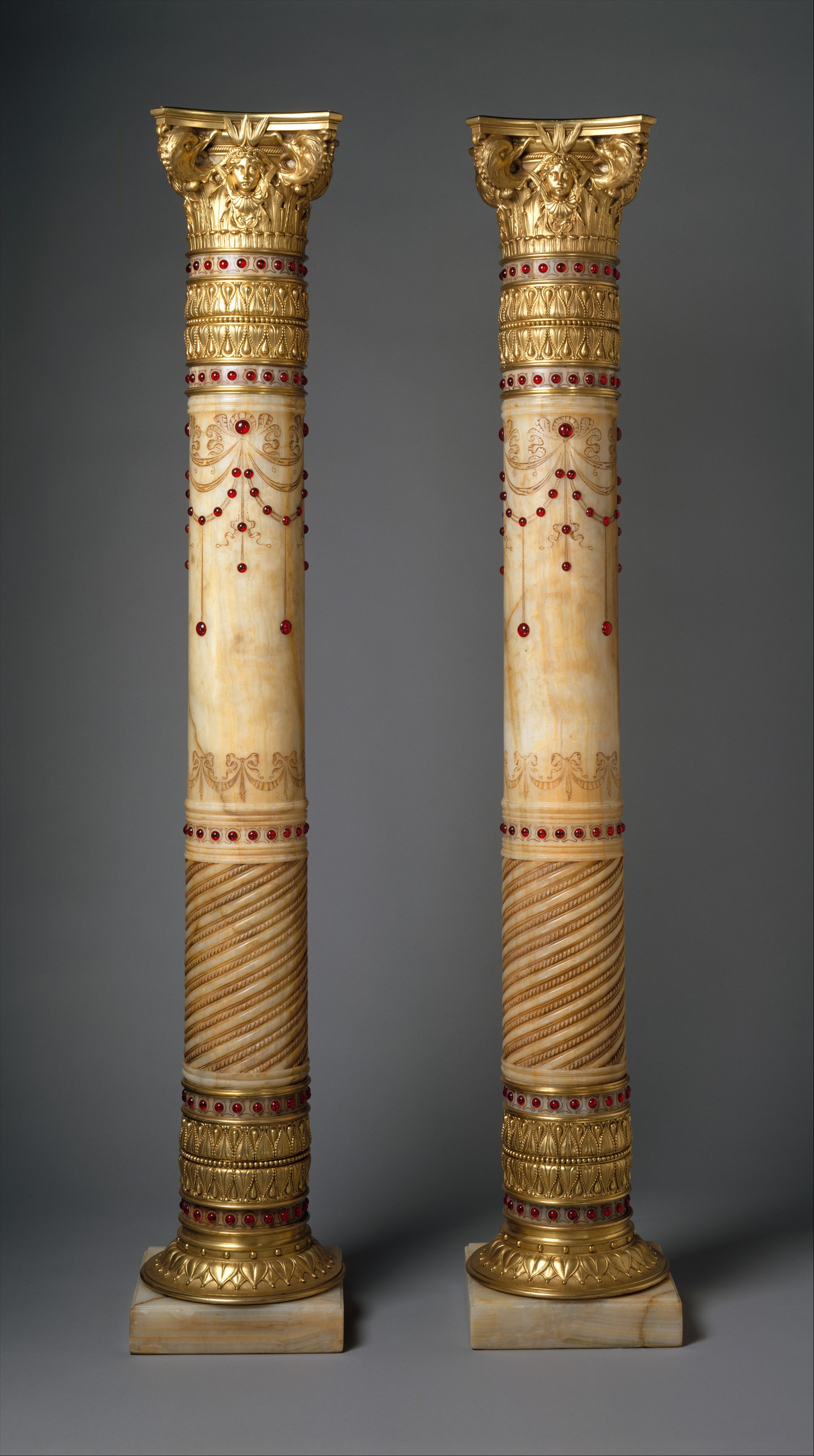
Pair of pedestals that reinterpret the Corinthian order (not just the capital, also the shaft), from the drawing room of the William H. Vanderbilt House, 1879–1882, Egyptian alabaster, gilt brass, and red glass jewels, Metropolitan Museum of Art, New York City

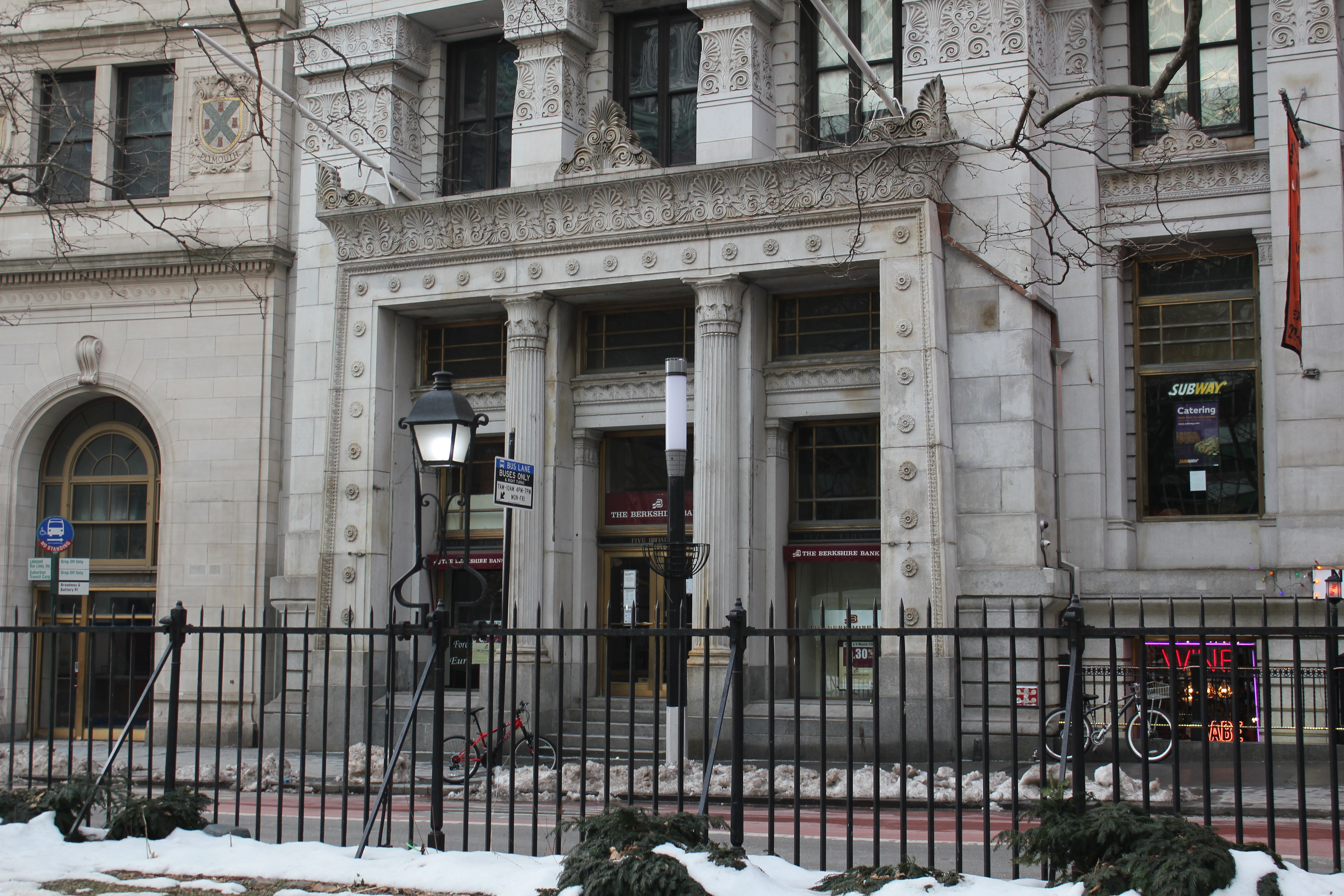
Greek Revival Corinthian columns of the Bowling Green Offices Building, New York City, a mix of those of the Tower of the Winds and those of the Choragic Monument of Lysicrates, by W. & G. Audsley, 1895–1898

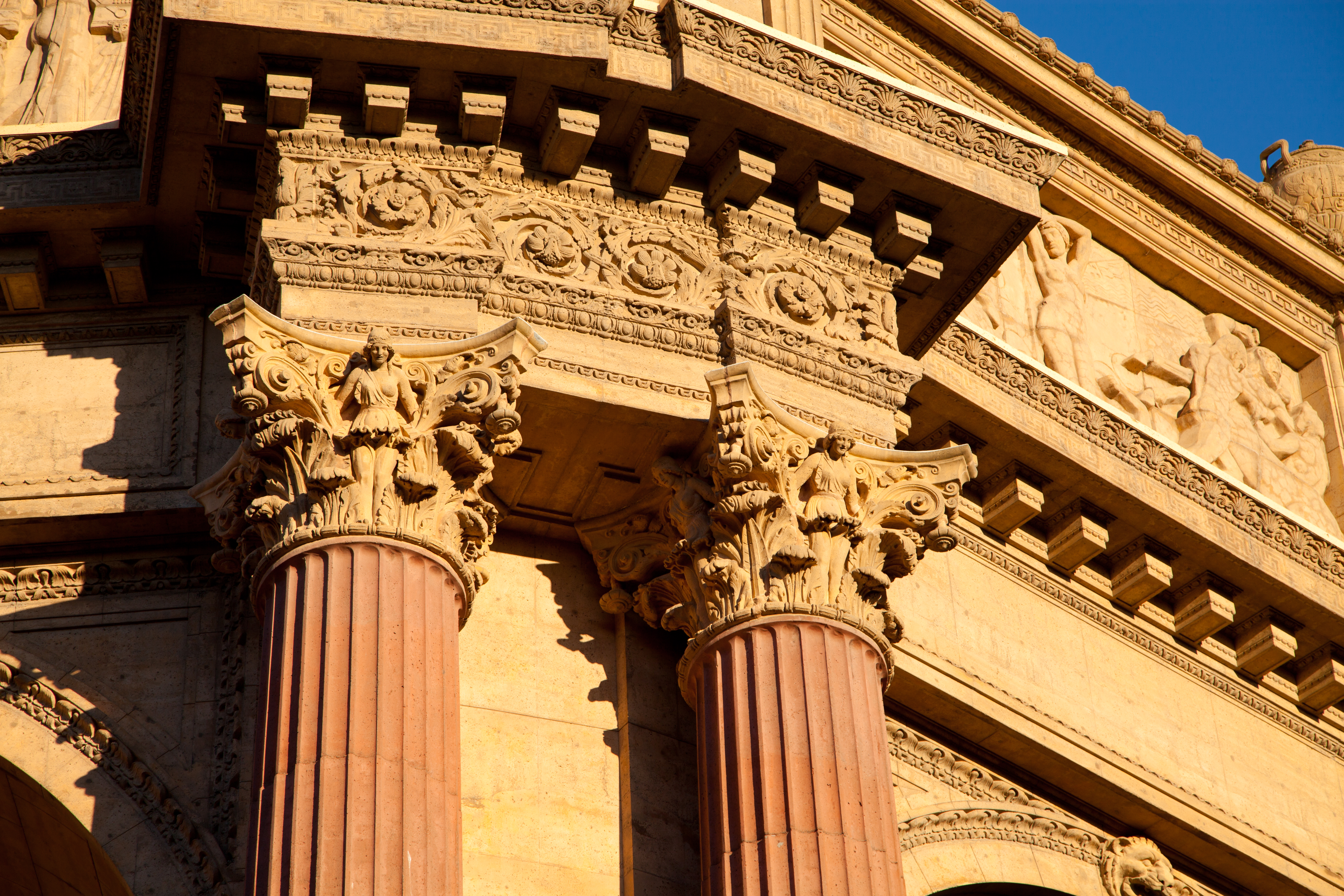
Beaux-Arts reinterpretation of the Corinthian order at the Rotunda of the Palace of Fine Arts, San Francisco, US, with a full figure on the capital, egg-and-dart on the astragal that is just under the capital, and two extra smaller volutes and a handle-like element on the canonic volutes of the capital corner, by Bernard Maybeck, 1913–1915

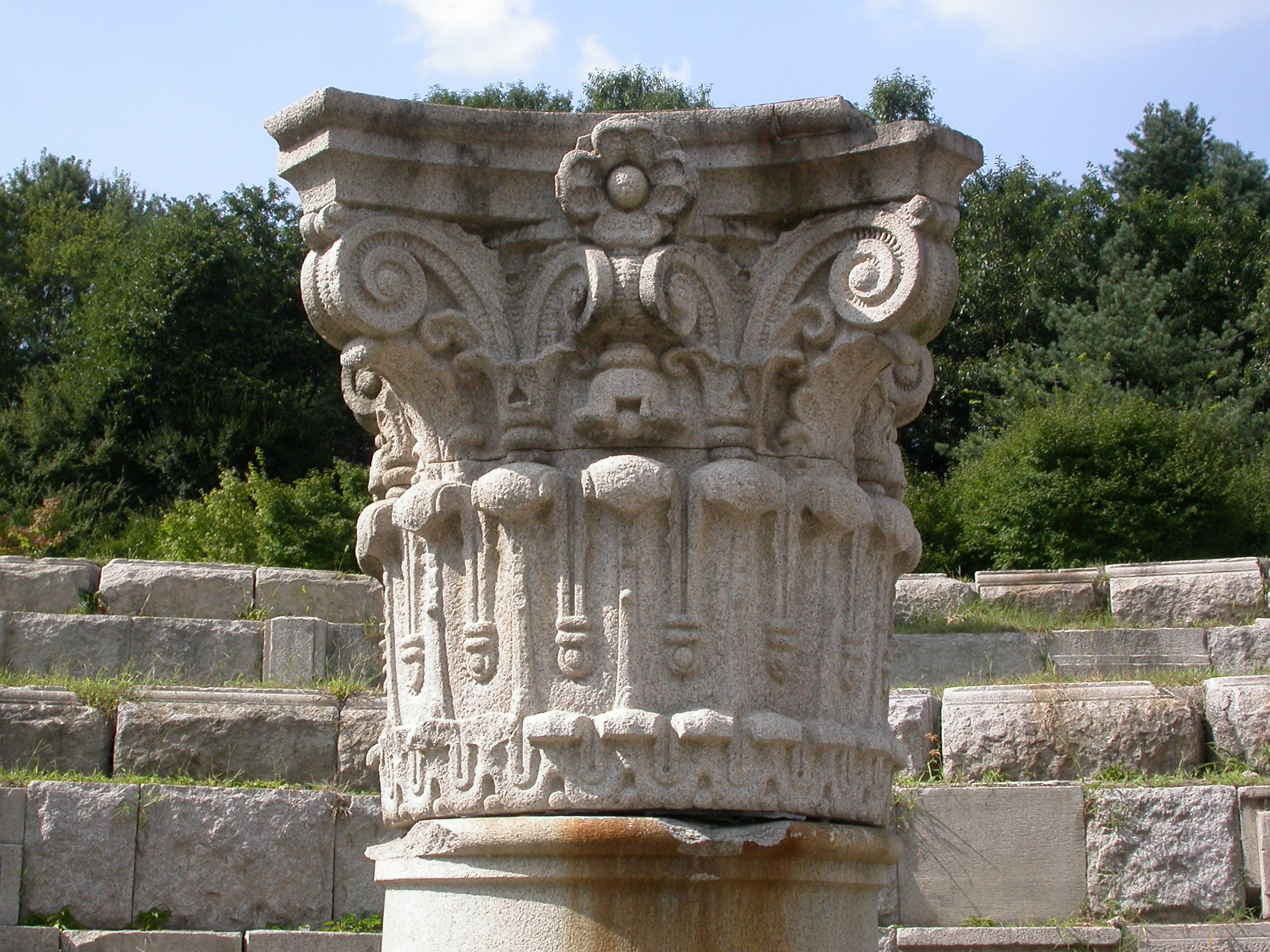
Neoclassical Corinthian capital from the Japanese General Government Building, granite, designed by Georg de Lalande in 1912–1914, built in 1920s, removed in 1995, Independence Hall of Korea, Cheonan, South Korea

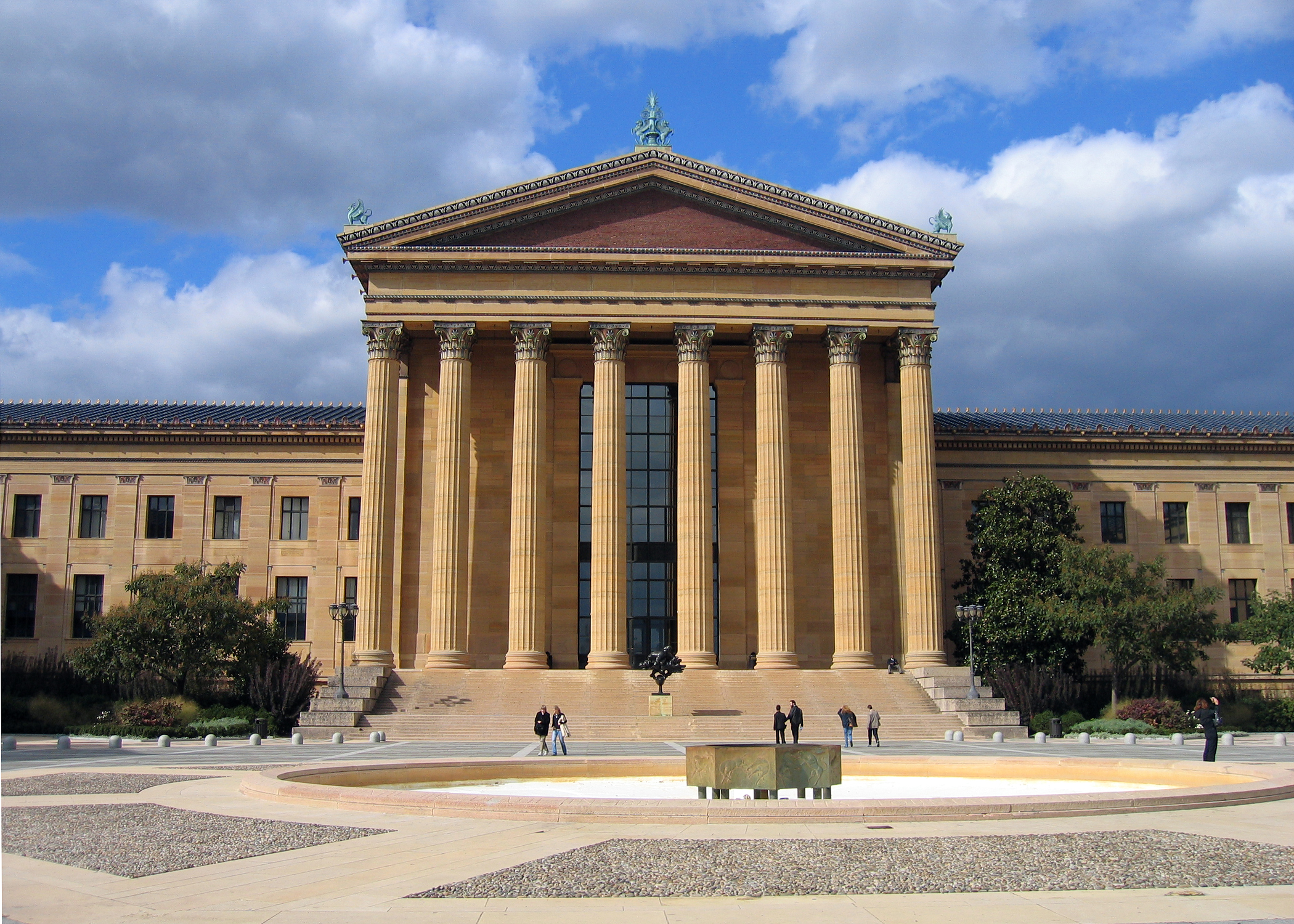
Neoclassical polychrome Corinthian columns, entablature and pediment of the Philadelphia Museum of Art, Philadelphia, US, by Horace Trumbauer and Zantzinger, Borie & Medary, 1933

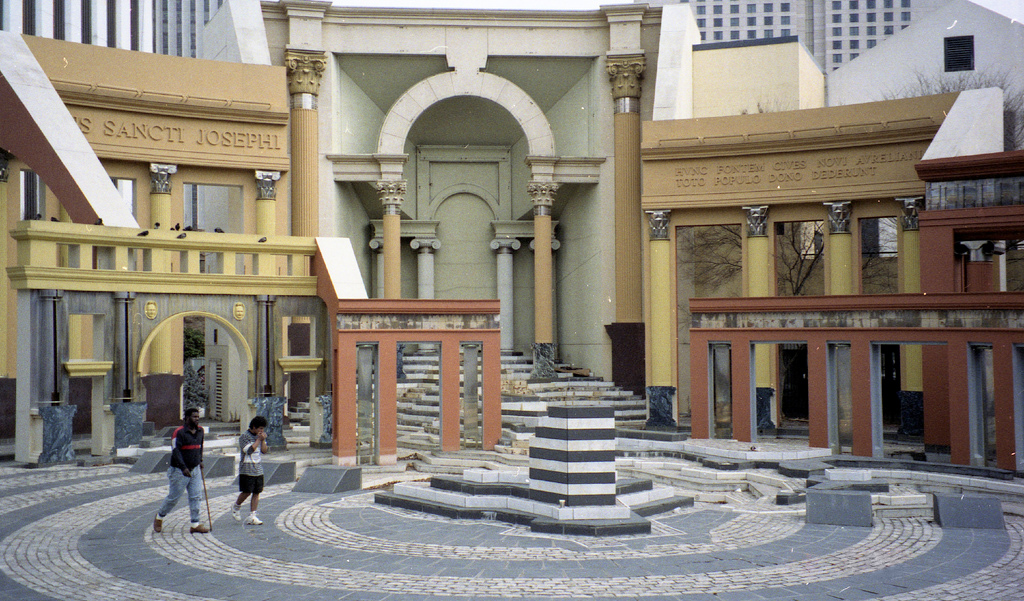
Postmodern Corinthian columns of the Piazza d'Italia, New Orleans, US, by Charles Moore, 1978–1979

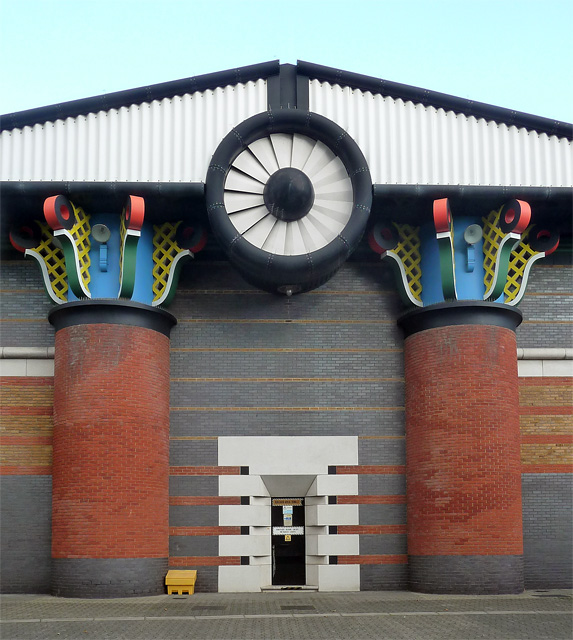
Reinterpreted Postmodern Corinthian columns of the Isle of Dogs Pumping Station, London, John Outram, 1988

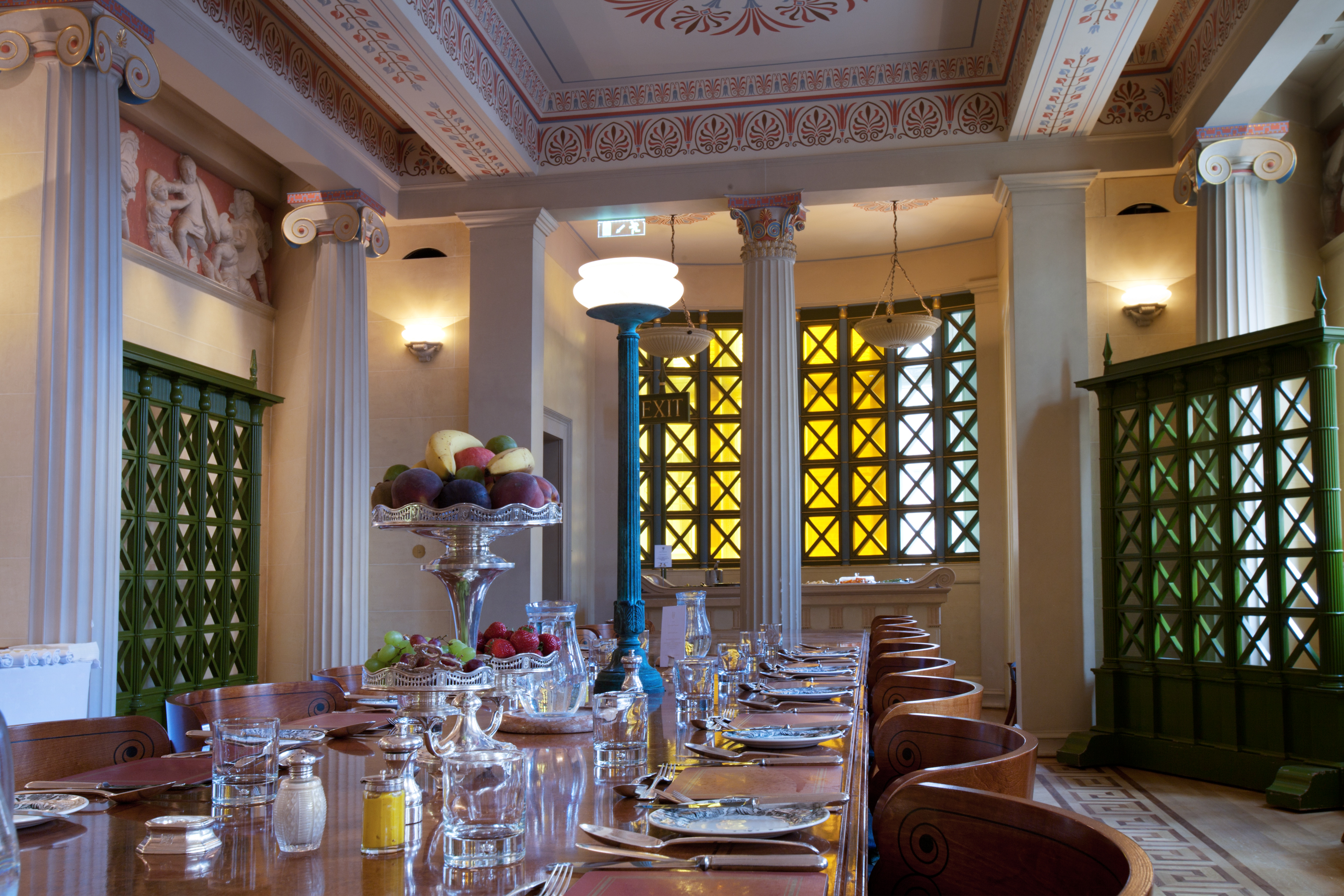
New Classical Greek Revival Corinthian column in the Gonville and Caius College Hall, Cambridge, UK, inspired by the one from the Temple of Apollo at Bassaem by John Simpson, 1998

New Classical Corinthian columns of the Chimei Museum, Tainan, Taiwan, by Tsai Yi-cheng, 2008–2015

== See also ==
- Giant order
- Superposed order
- Chapelle Sainte Radegonde (Chinon)
