= List of airports in Austria =

Airports in Austria

This is a list of airports in Austria, sorted by location

== Airports ==
Airport names shown in bold indicate the airport has scheduled service on commercial airlines.

City served	State	ICAO	IATA	Airport name	Coordinates
Aigen im Ennstal	Styria	LOXA		Military Airport Aigen im Ennstal	47°32′09″N 014°08′29″E
Bad Vöslau	Lower Austria	LOAV		Vöslau Airfield	47°57′53″N 016°15′39″E
Dobersberg	Lower Austria	LOAB		Dobersberg Airport	48°55′20″N 015°17′49″E
Dornbirn	Vorarlberg	LOIH	HOH	Hohenems-Dornbirn Airport	47°23′04″N 009°41′59″E
Eferding	Upper Austria	LOLE		Eferding Airport	48°20′20″N 013°59′07″E
Feldkirchen in Kärnten	Carinthia	LOKF		Feldkirchen-Ossiacher See Airport	46°42′30″N 014°04′34″E
Ferlach	Carinthia	LOKG		Ferlach-Glainach Airport	46°31′58″N 014°19′51″E
Freistadt	Upper Austria	LOLF		Freistadt Airport	48°30′50″N 014°24′23″E
Friesach	Carinthia	LOKH		Friesach/Hirt Airport	46°55′39″N 014°25′55″E
Fürstenfeld	Styria	LOGF		Fürstenfeld Airport	47°03′43″N 016°05′02″E
Gmunden	Upper Austria	LOLU		Gmunden Laarkirchen Airport	47°57′06″N 013°52′02″E
Graz	Styria	LOWG	GRZ	**Graz Airport**	46°59′27″N 015°26′22″E
Hofkirchen im Traunkreis	Upper Austria	LOLH		Hofkirchen Airport	48°08′21″N 014°20′09″E
Innsbruck	Tyrol	LOWI	INN	**Innsbruck Airport**	47°15′36″N 011°20′38″E
Kapfenberg	Styria	LOGK		Kapfenberg Airport	47°27′27″N 015°19′54″E
Klagenfurt	Carinthia	LOWK	KLU	**Klagenfurt Airport** (Kärnten Airport)	46°38′33″N 014°20′15″E
Krems an der Donau	Lower Austria	LOAG		Krems-Langenlois Airport	48°26′46″N 015°38′02″E
Kufstein	Tyrol	LOIK		Kufstein-Langkampfen Airport	47°33′53″N 012°07′38″E
Leopoldsdorf im Marchfelde	Lower Austria	LOAL		Leopoldsdorf im Marchfelde Airport	48°13′35″N 016°40′22″E
Lienz	Tyrol	LOKL		Lienz-Nikolsdorf Airport	46°47′53″N 012°52′41″E
Linz	Upper Austria	LOWL	LNZ	**Linz Airport** (blue danube airport linz)	48°13′59″N 014°11′15″E
Linz	Upper Austria	LOLO		Linz-East Airport	48°17′57″N 014°20′04″E
Mariazell	Styria	LOGM		Mariazell Airport	47°47′23″N 015°18′01″E
Mauterndorf	Salzburg	LOSM		Mauterndorf Airport	47°07′55″N 013°41′45″E
Mayerhofen	Carinthia	LOKM		Mayerhofen Airport	46°58′30″N 014°22′16″E
Micheldorf	Upper Austria	LOLM		Micheldorf Airport	47°52′18″N 014°07′31″E
Niederöblarn	Styria	LOGO		Niederöblarn Airport	47°28′44″N 014°00′26″E
Nötsch im Gailtal	Carinthia	LOKN		Nötsch im Gailtal Airport	46°34′50″N 013°37′48″E
Ottenschlag	Lower Austria	LOAA		Ottenschlag Airport	48°25′07″N 015°12′55″E
Pinkafeld	Burgenland	LOGP		Pinkafeld Airport	47°23′12″N 016°06′46″E
Punitz	Burgenland	LOGG		Punitz-Güssing Airport	47°08′49″N 016°19′00″E
Retz	Lower Austria			Retzer Land Heliport	48°45′16″N 015°57′44″E
Reutte	Tyrol	LOIR		Reutte-Höfen Airport	47°28′16″N 010°41′30″E
Ried im Innkreis	Upper Austria	LOLK		Ried-Kirchheim Airport	48°12′44″N 013°20′45″E
Salzburg	Salzburg	LOWS	SZG	**Salzburg Airport** (Salzburg Airport W.A. Mozart)	47°47′35″N 013°00′15″E
Sankt Georgen am Ybbsfelde	Lower Austria	LOLG		Sankt Georgen Airport	48°06′11″N 014°57′03″E
Sankt Johann in Tirol	Tyrol	LOIJ		Sankt Johann Airport	47°31′13″N 012°26′58″E
Sankt Johann in Tirol	Tyrol	LOIT		Sankt Johann in Tirol Heliport	47°31′15″N 012°25′47″E
Schärding	Upper Austria	LOLS		Schärding-Suben Airport	48°24′11″N 013°26′54″E
Scharnstein	Upper Austria	LOLC		Scharnstein Airport	47°53′52″N 013°56′18″E
Schruns	Vorarlberg	LOIY		Heliport Sanatorium Dr. Schenk	47°04′26″N 009°54′48″E
Schwaz	Tyrol	LOXI		Schwaz Heliport	47°20′06″N 011°41′51″E
Seitenstetten	Lower Austria	LOLT		Seitenstetten Airport	48°03′00″N 014°39′45″E
Spitzerberg	Lower Austria	LOAS		Spitzerberg Airport	48°05′56″N 016°56′00″E
Stockerau	Lower Austria	LOAU		Stockerau Airport	48°24′33″N 016°11′28″E
Timmersdorf	Styria	LOGT		Leoben/Timmersdorf Airfield	47°22′47″N 014°57′50″E
Trausdorf an der Wulka	Burgenland	LOAT		Trausdorf Airport	47°47′58″N 016°33′28″E
Tulln an der Donau	Lower Austria	LOXT		Brumowski Air Base	48°19′10″N 016°06′51″E
Turnau	Styria	LOGL		Lanzen-Turnau Airport	47°33′23″N 015°19′18″E
Vienna (Wien)	Lower Austria	LOWW	VIE	**Vienna International Airport** (Wien-Schwechat Airport)	48°06′37″N 016°34′11″E
Vomp	Tyrol	LOXI		Military Helibase Vomp	47°32′09″N 014°08′29″E
Völtendorf	Lower Austria	LOAD		Völtendorf Airport	48°09′37″N 015°35′16″E
Weiz	Styria	LOGW		Weiz-Unterfladnitz Airport	47°10′12″N 015°39′52″E
Wels	Upper Austria	LOLW		Wels Airport	48°11′02″N 014°02′24″E
Wiener Neustadt	Lower Austria	LOAN		Wiener Neustadt East Airport	47°50′36″N 016°15′36″E
Wiener Neustadt	Lower Austria	LOXN		Wiener Neustadt West Airport	47°50′27″N 016°13′18″E
Wolfsberg	Carinthia	LOKW		Wolfsberg Airport	46°49′04″N 014°49′30″E
Zell am See	Salzburg	LOWZ		Zell am See Airport	47°17′29″N 012°47′24″E
Zeltweg	Styria	LOXZ		Zeltweg Air Base	47°12′09″N 014°44′39″E

== See also ==
- Transport in Austria
- Austrian Air Force
- List of airports by ICAO code: L#LO – Austria
- Wikipedia: WikiProject Aviation/Airline destination lists: Europe#Austria
