= Seitenstetten Airport =

Seitenstetten Airport Flugplatz Seitenstetten
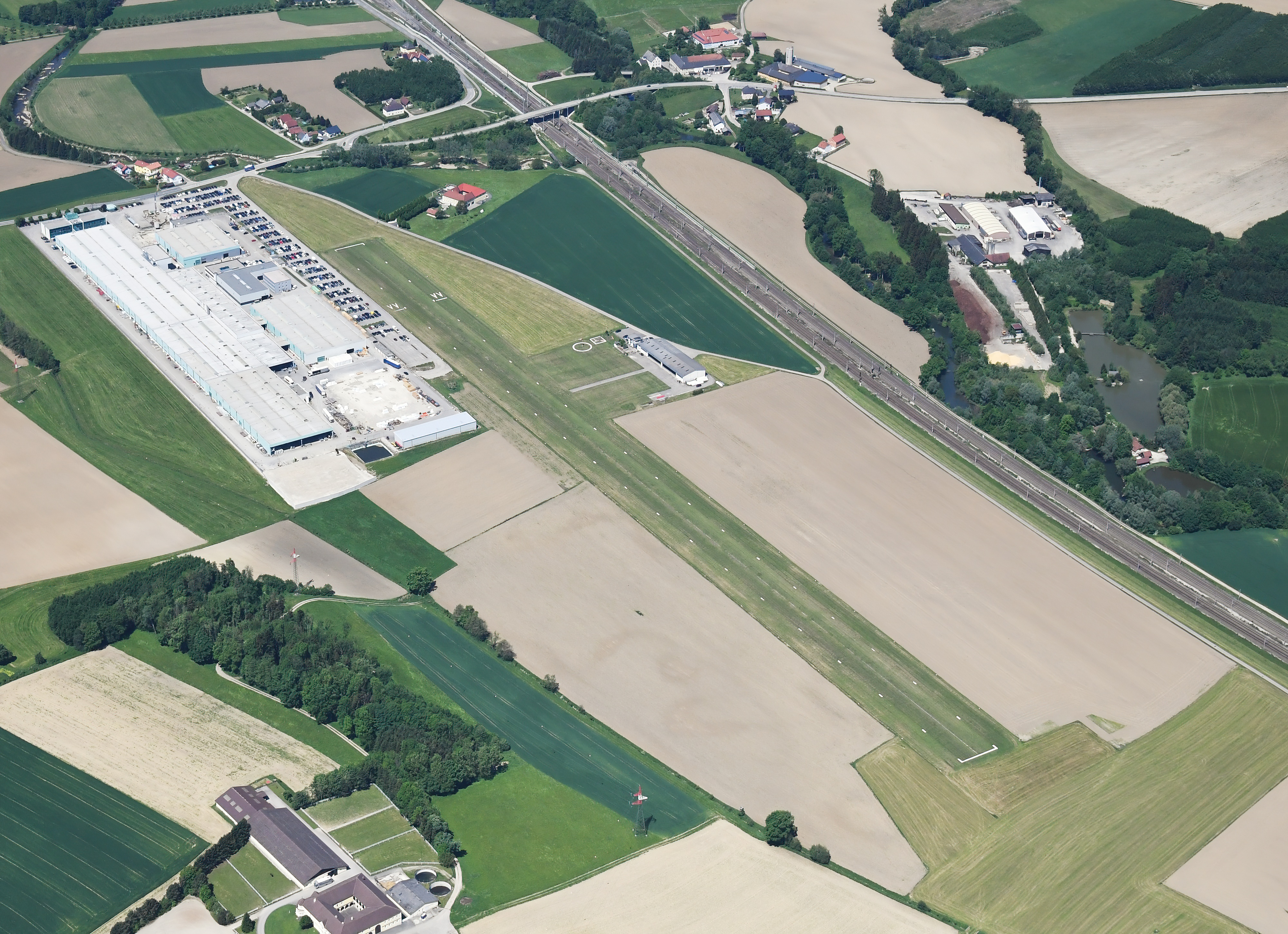
- IATA: none; ICAO: LOLT

Summary
- Airport type: Private
- Serves: Seitenstetten
- Location: Austria
- Elevation AMSL: 1,053 ft / 321 m
- Coordinates: 48°3′0.4″N 014°39′45.1″E

Map
- Location of Seitenstetten Airport in Austria

Runways
Direction	Length		Surface
Direction	ft	m	Surface
10/28	2,650	808	Grass
- Source: Landings.com

Seitenstetten Airport (German: Flugplatz Seitenstetten, ICAO: LOLT) is a private use airport located 2 kilometres (1 mi) north-northeast of Seitenstetten, Lower Austria, Austria.

== See also ==
- List of airports in Austria
