= Leopoldsdorf im Marchfeld Airport =

- IATA: none; ICAO: LOAL

Summary
- Airport type: Public
- Serves: Leopoldsdorf im Marchfeld
- Location: Austria
- Elevation AMSL: 495 ft / 151 m
- Coordinates: 48°13′35.3″N 16°40′22.3″E

Map
- Location of Leopoldsdorf im Marchfeld Airport in Austria

Runways
Direction	Length		Surface
Direction	m	ft	Surface
14/32	482	1,580	Grass
- Source: Landings.com

Leopoldsdorf im Marchfeld Airport (ICAO: LOAL) is a public use airport located 1 nm west of Leopoldsdorf im Marchfeld, Niederösterreich, Austria.

== See also ==
- List of airports in Austria
