= Micheldorf Airport =

Micheldorf Airport Flugplatz Micheldorf
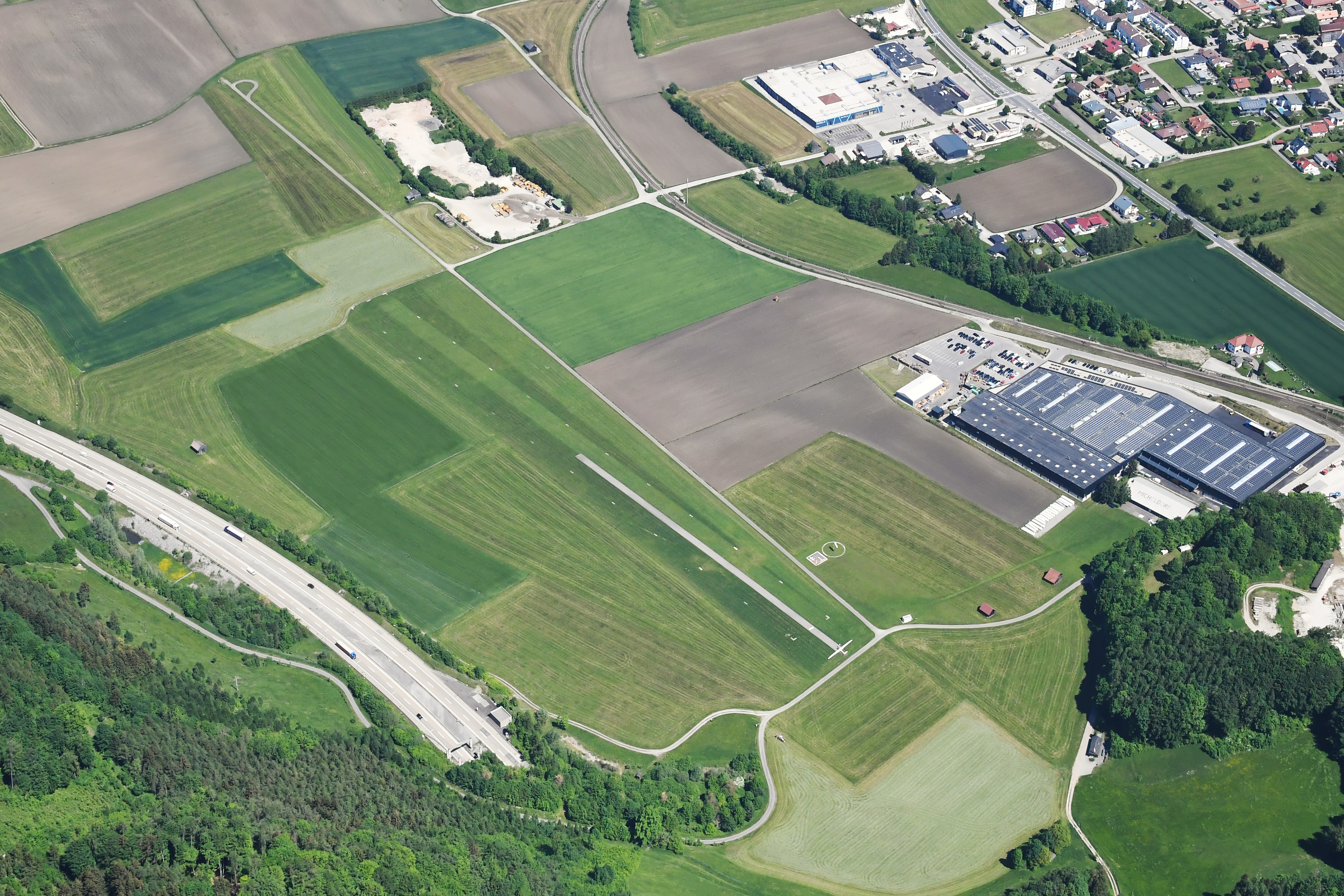
- IATA: none; ICAO: LOLM

Summary
- Airport type: Private
- Serves: Micheldorf in Oberösterreich
- Location: Austria
- Elevation AMSL: 1,512 ft / 461 m
- Coordinates: 47°52′18.0″N 014°7′30.7″E

Map
- Location of Micheldorf Airport in Austria

Runways
Direction	Length		Surface
Direction	ft	m	Surface
13/31	1,590	485	Grass
- Source: Landings.com

Micheldorf Airport (German: Flugplatz Micheldorf, ICAO: LOLM) is a private use airport located 1 kilometre (1 mi) southwest of Micheldorf, Upper Austria, Austria.

== See also ==
- List of airports in Austria
