= Pinkafeld Airport =

Pinkafeld Airport Flugplatz Pinkafeld
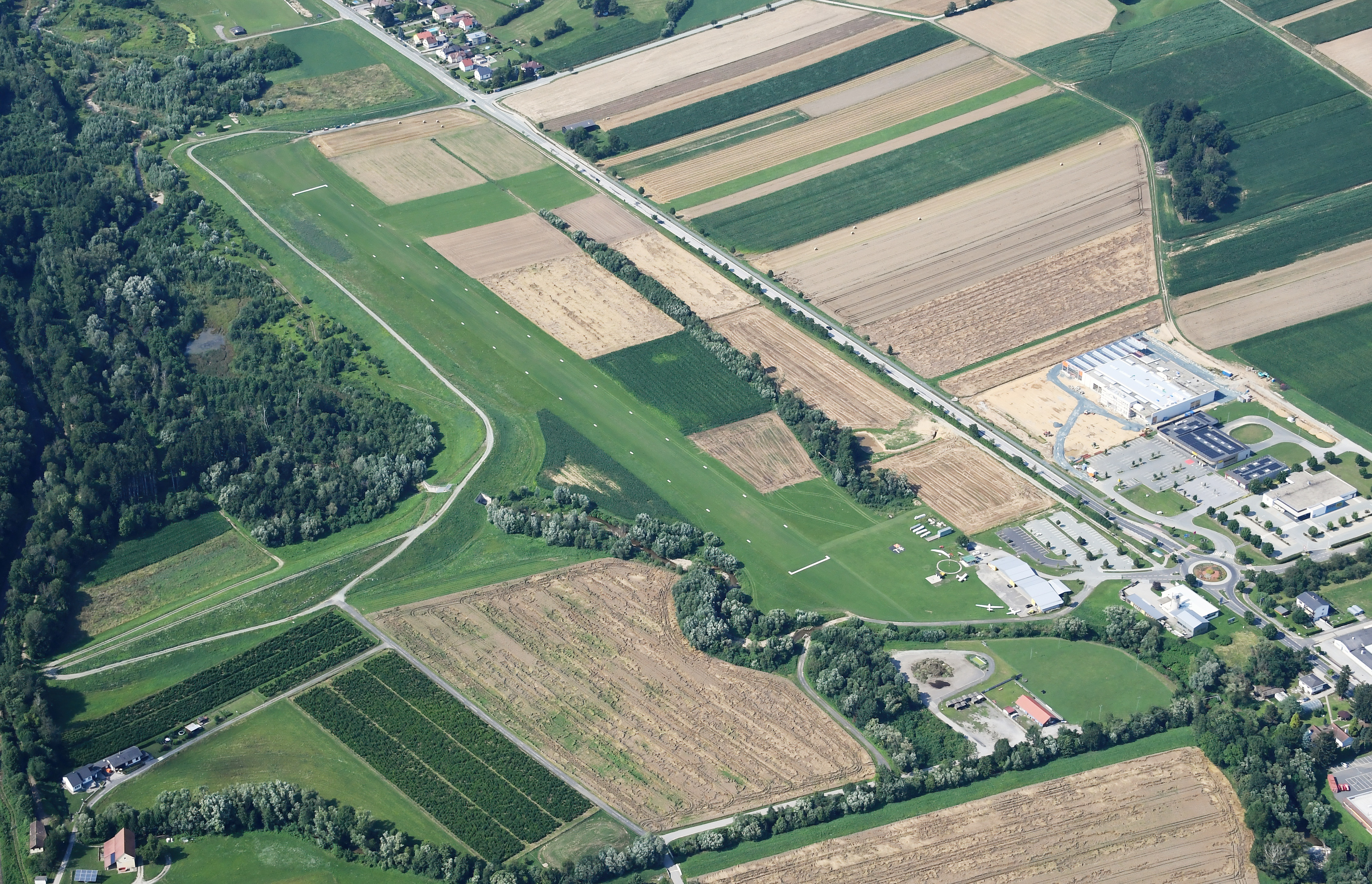
- IATA: none; ICAO: LOGP

Summary
- Airport type: Private
- Serves: Pinkafeld
- Location: Austria
- Elevation AMSL: 1,341 ft / 409 m
- Coordinates: 47°23′11.9″N 016°6′46.0″E

Map
- Location of Pinkafeld Airport in Austria

Runways
Direction	Length		Surface
Direction	ft	m	Surface
15/33	2,020	616	Grass
- Source: Landings.com

Pinkafeld Airport (German: Flugplatz Pinkafeld, ICAO: LOGP) is a private use airport located 2 kilometres (1 mi) north-northwest of Pinkafeld, Burgenland, Austria.

== See also ==
- List of airports in Austria
