= Military Airport Aigen im Ennstal =

Military Airport Aigen im Ennstal Militärflugplatz Aigen im Ennstal
- IATA: none; ICAO: LOXA

Summary
- Airport type: Military
- Serves: Aigen im Ennstal
- Location: Austria
- Elevation AMSL: 2,129 ft / 649 m
- Coordinates: 47°32′8.5″N 014°8′29.0″E

Map
- Location of Military Airport Aigen im Ennstal in Austria

Runways
Direction	Length		Surface
Direction	ft	m	Surface
06/24	3,460	1,055	Grass
- Source: Landings.com

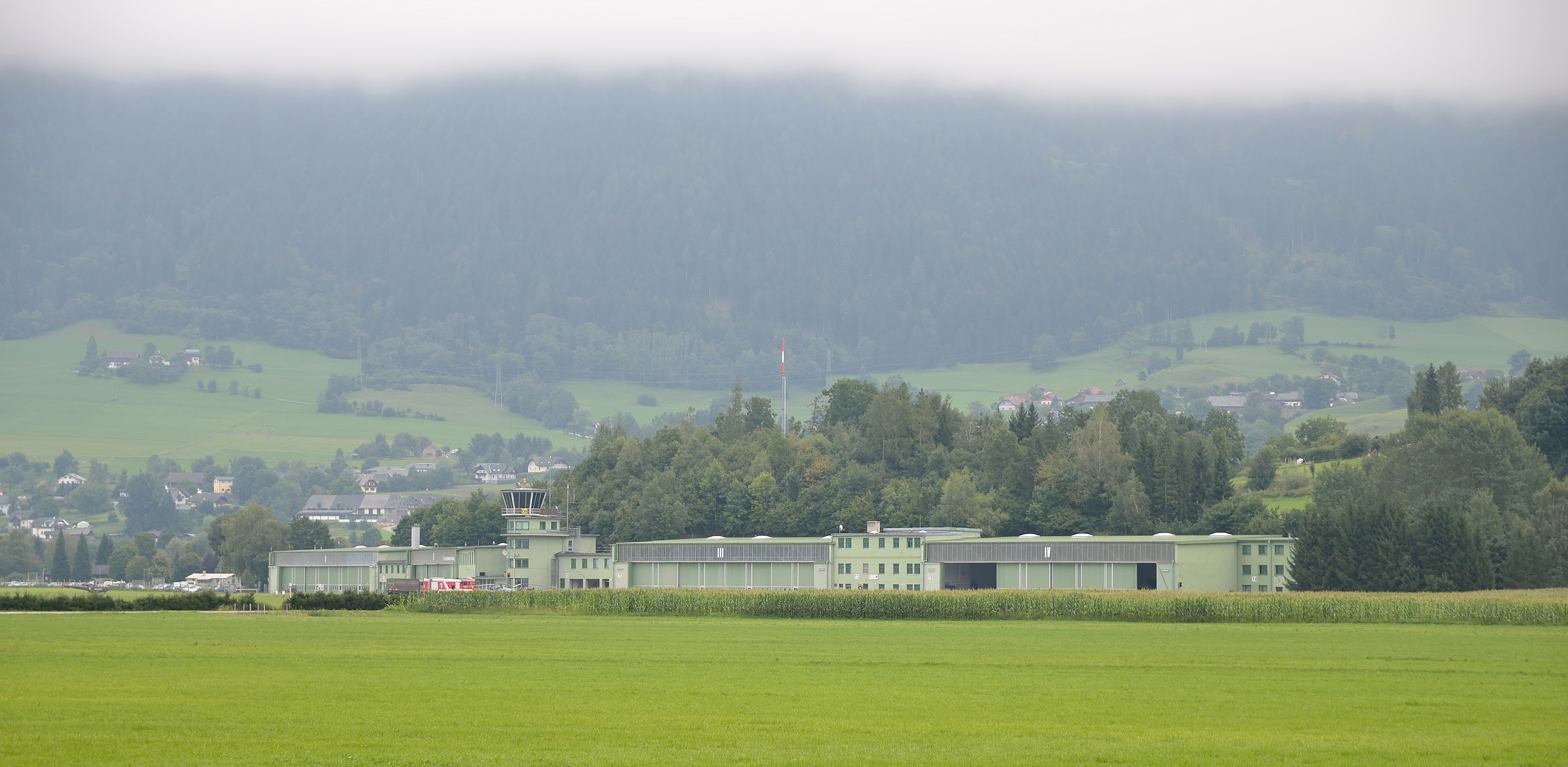
Military Airport Aigen im Ennstal

Military Airport Aigen im Ennstal (German: Militärflugplatz Aigen im Ennstal, ICAO: LOXA) is a military airport located 1 kilometre (0.62 mi) east of Aigen im Ennstal, Styria, Austria. It was temporarily closed in the wake of 1945

== See also ==
- List of airports in Austria
