= Sankt Johann in Tirol Heliport =

- IATA: none; ICAO: LOIT

Summary
- Airport type: Public
- Serves: Sankt Johann in Tirol
- Location: Austria
- Elevation AMSL: 2,123 ft / 647 m
- Coordinates: 47°31′15.2″N 12°25′46.5″E

Map
- Location of Sankt Johann in Tirol Heliport in Austria

Helipads
Number	Length		Surface
Number	m	ft	Surface
1	16	52	Asphalt
- Source: Landings.com

Sankt Johann in Tirol Heliport (ICAO: LOIT) is a public use heliport located in Sankt Johann in Tirol, Tirol, Austria.

== See also ==
- List of airports in Austria
