= Scharnstein Airport =

Scharnstein Airport Flugplatz Scharnstein
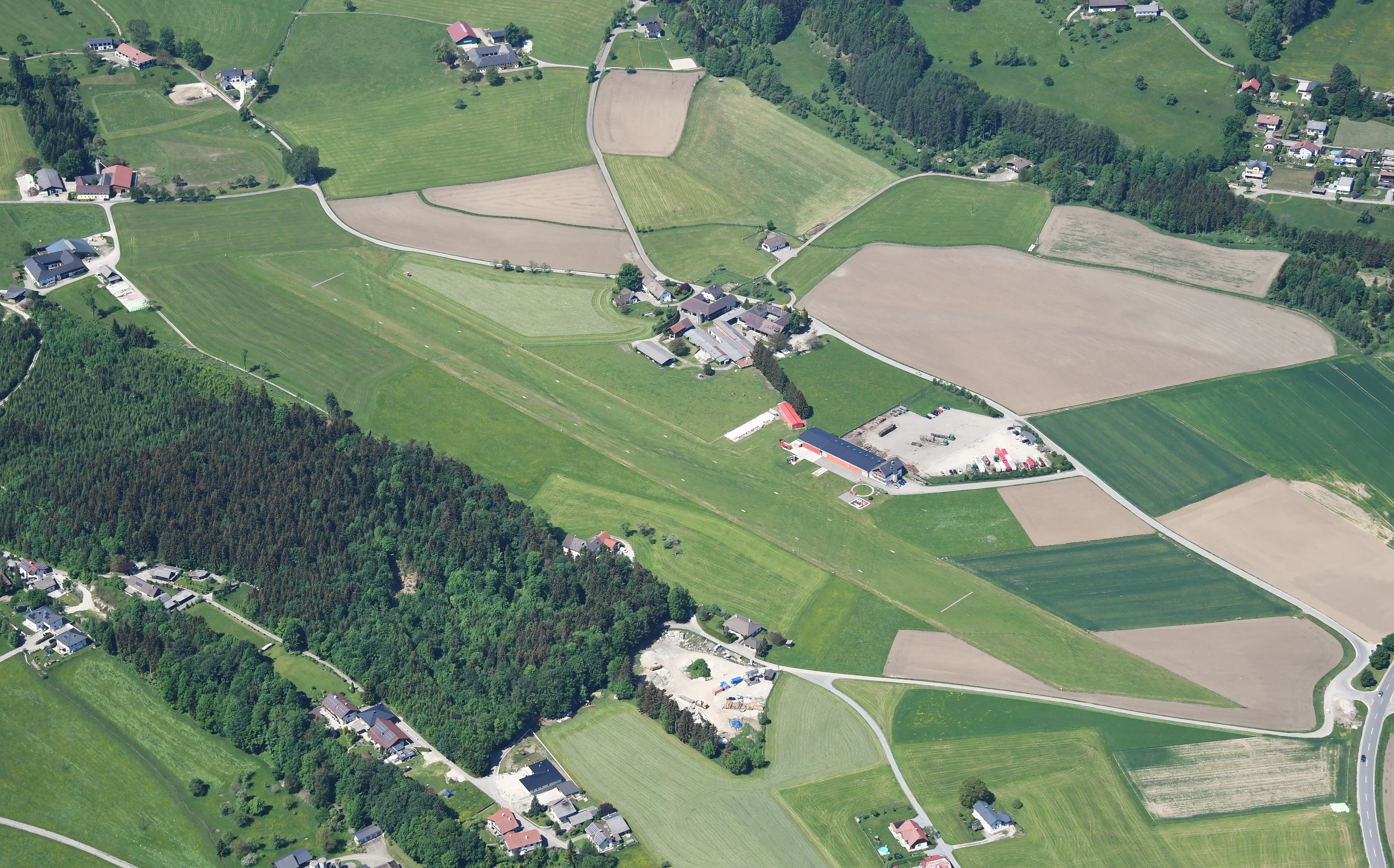
- IATA: none; ICAO: LOLC

Summary
- Airport type: Private
- Serves: Scharnstein
- Location: Austria
- Elevation AMSL: 1,745 ft / 532 m
- Coordinates: 47°53′52.2″N 013°56′17.5″E

Map
- Location of Scharnstein Airport in Austria

Runways
Direction	Length		Surface
Direction	ft	m	Surface
05/23	1,930	588	Grass
- Source: Landings.com

Scharnstein Airport (German: Flugplatz Scharnstein, ICAO: LOLC) is a private use airport located 2 kilometres (1 mi) west-southwest of Scharnstein, Upper Austria, Austria.

== See also ==
- List of airports in Austria
