= Weiz-Unterfladnitz Airport =

Weiz-Unterfladnitz Airport Flugplatz Weiz-Unterfladnitz
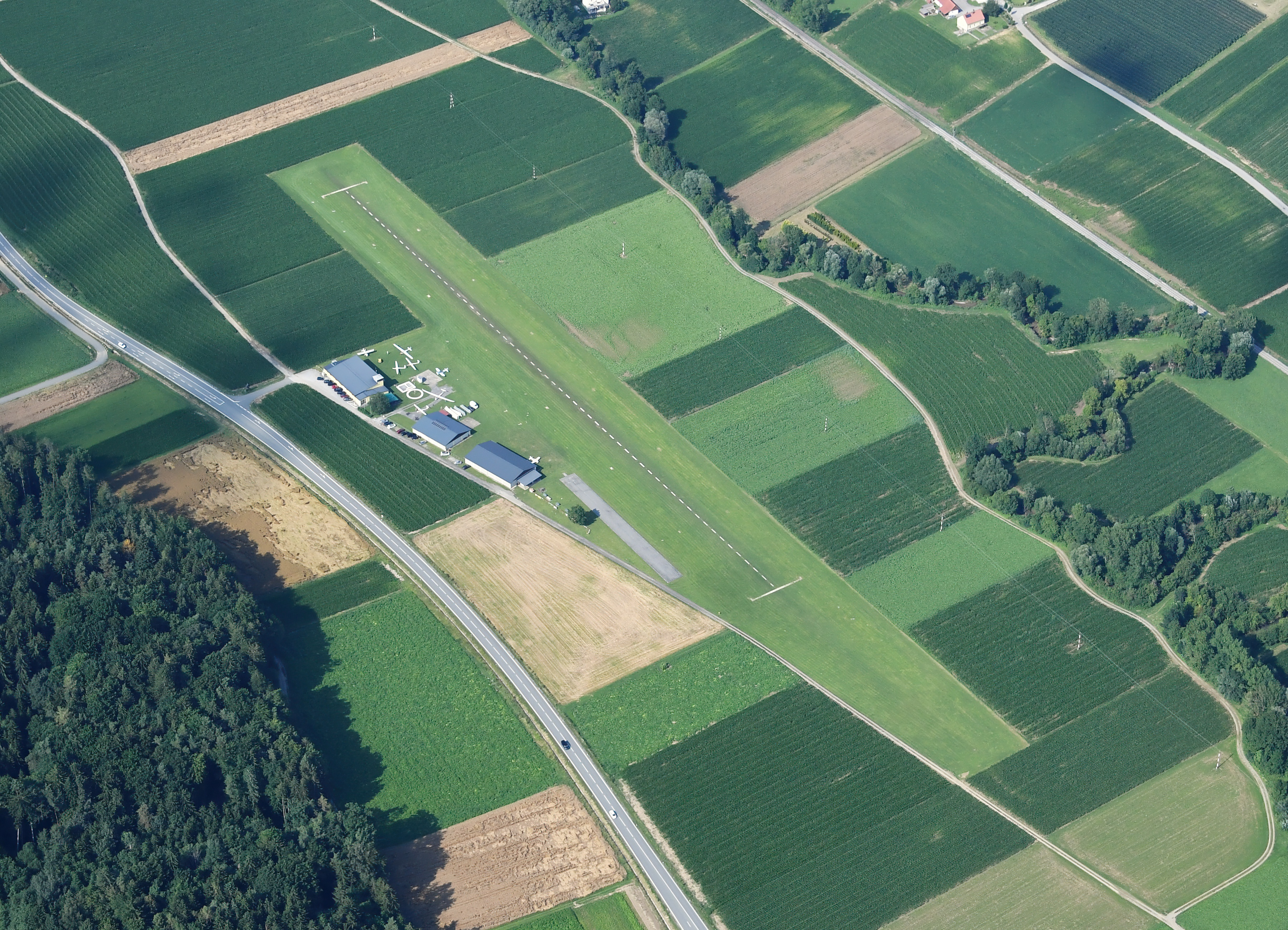
- IATA: none; ICAO: LOGW

Summary
- Airport type: Private
- Owner: FSC Weiz
- Serves: Weiz
- Location: Austria
- Elevation AMSL: 1,296 ft / 395 m
- Coordinates: 47°10′12.4″N 015°39′52.1″E

Map
- Location of Weiz-Unterfladnitz Airport in Austria

Runways
Direction	Length		Surface
Direction	ft	m	Surface
18/36	1,443 x 98	440 x 30	Grass
- Source: Landings.com

Weiz-Unterfladnitz Airport (German: Flugplatz Weiz-Unterfladnitz, ICAO: LOGW) is a private use airport located 6 kilometres (4 mi) south-southeast of Weiz, Styria, Austria.

== See also ==
- List of airports in Austria
