= Ried-Kirchheim Airport =

Ried-Kirchheim Airport Flugplatz Ried-Kirchheim
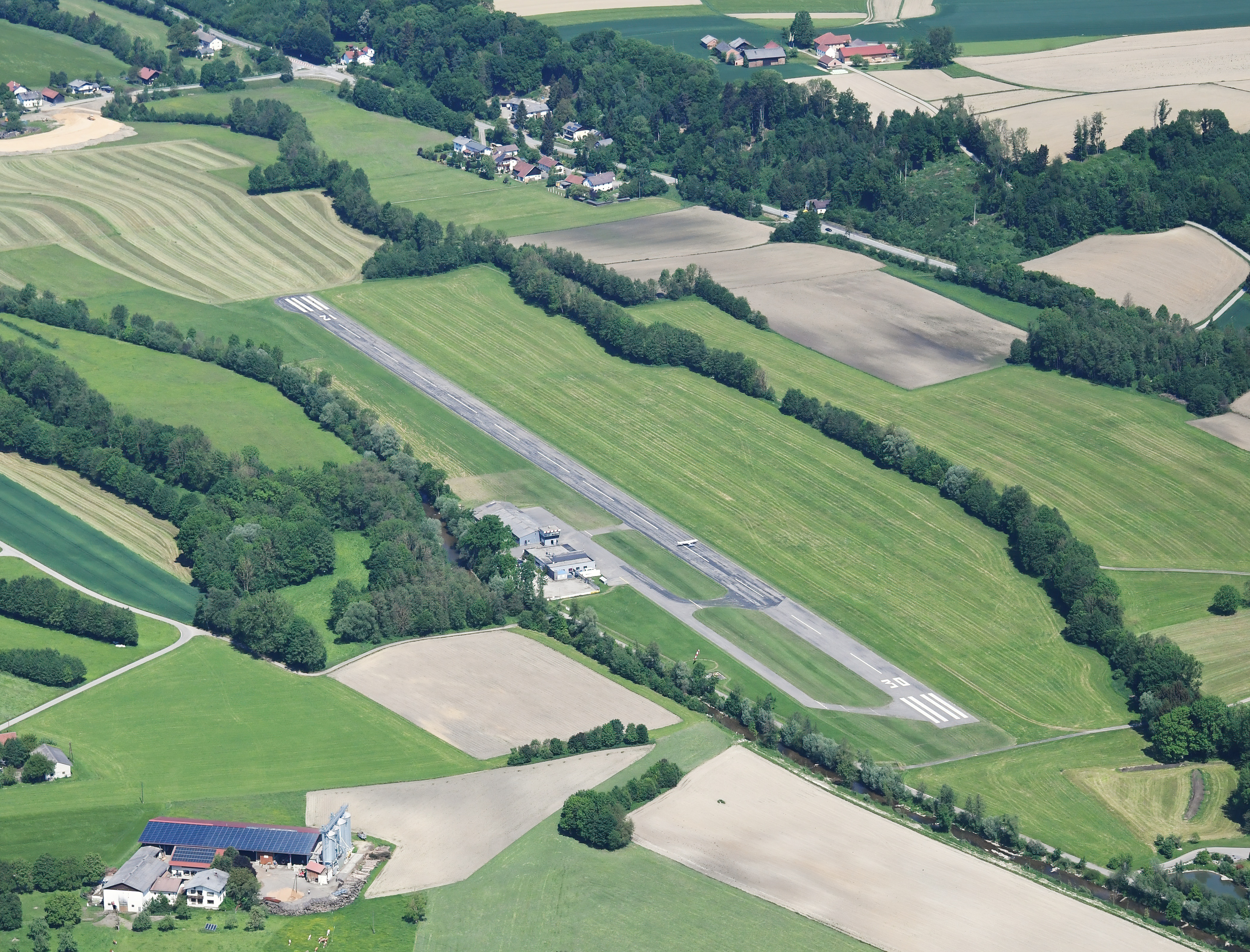
- IATA: none; ICAO: LOLK

Summary
- Airport type: Private
- Serves: Ried im Innkreis
- Location: Austria
- Elevation AMSL: 1,384 ft / 422 m
- Coordinates: 48°12′43.9″N 013°20′45.2″E

Map
- Location of Ried-Kirchheim Airport in Austria

Runways
Direction	Length		Surface
Direction	ft	m	Surface
12/30	2,440	744	Asphalt
- Source: Landings.com

Ried-Kirchheim Airport (German: Flugplatz Ried-Kirchheim, ICAO: LOLK) is a private use airport located 11 kilometres (7 mi) west of Ried im Innkreis, Upper Austria, Austria.

== See also ==
- List of airports in Austria
