= Eferding Airport =

Eferding Airport Flugplatz Eferding
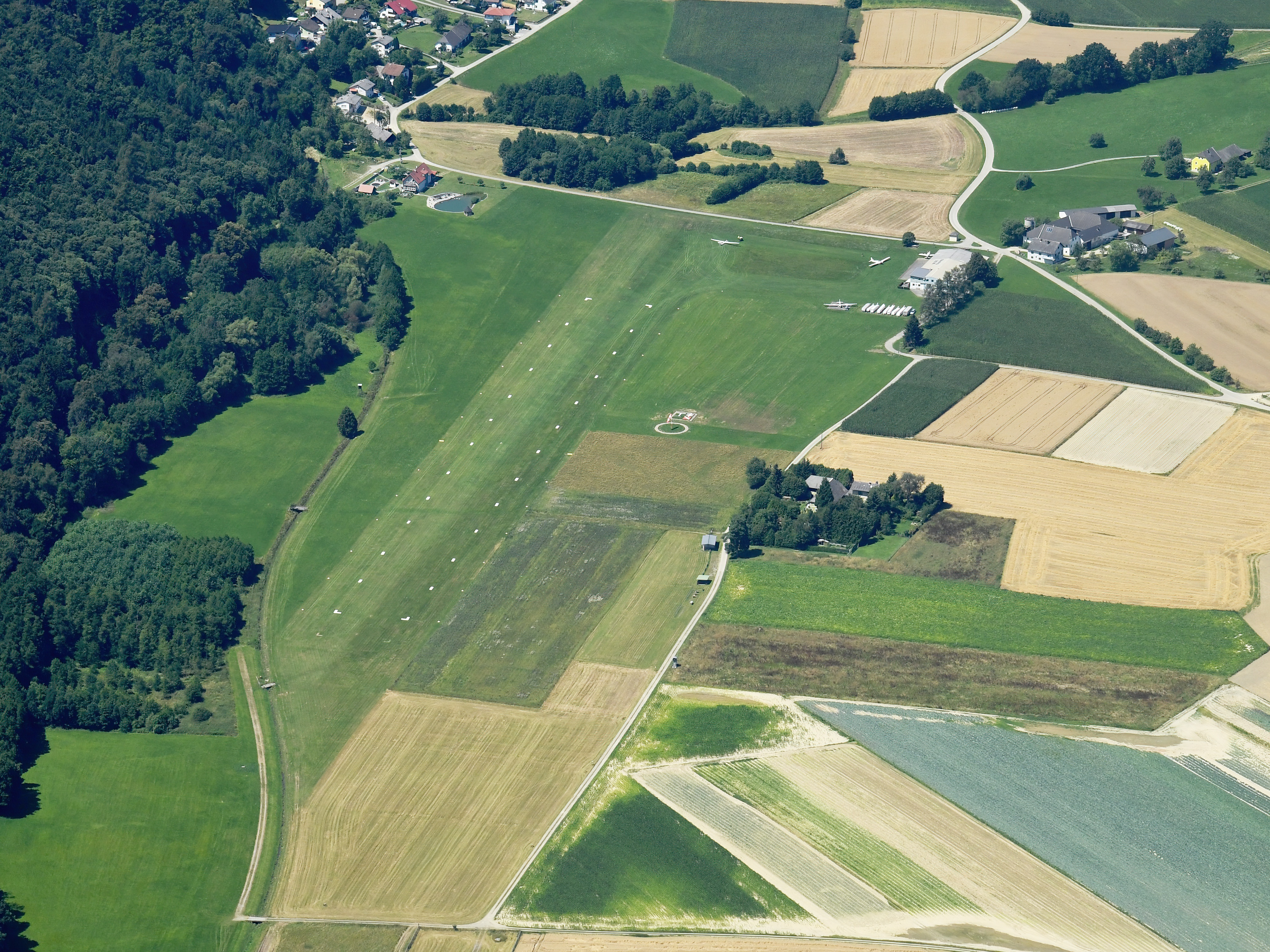
- IATA: none; ICAO: LOLE

Summary
- Airport type: Private
- Serves: Eferding
- Location: Austria
- Elevation AMSL: 892 ft / 272 m
- Coordinates: 48°20′19.6″N 013°59′6.8″E

Map
- Location of Eferding Airport in Austria

Runways
Direction	Length		Surface
Direction	ft	m	Surface
15/33	1,390	424	Grass
- Source: Landings.com

Eferding Airport (German: Flugplatz Eferding, ICAO: LOLE) is a private use airport located 4 kilometres (2.5 mi) northwest of Eferding, Oberösterreich, Austria.

== See also ==
- List of airports in Austria
