= Heliport Sanatorium Dr. Schenk =

- IATA: none; ICAO: LOIY

Summary
- Airport type: Private, medical use
- Serves: Schruns
- Location: Austria
- Elevation AMSL: 2,048 ft (624 m)
- Coordinates: 47°4′25.7″N 9°54′47.8″E

Map
- Location of Heliport Sanatorium Dr. Schenk in Austria

Helipads
| Number | Length | | Surface |
| Number | m | ft | Surface |
|---|---|---|---|
| 1 | 17 | 56 | Asphalt |
- Source: Landings.com

Heliport Sanatorium Dr. Schenk (ICAO: LOIY) is a private, medical-use-only heliport located in Schruns, Vorarlberg, Austria.

== See also ==
- List of airports in Austria
