= Kufstein-Langkampfen Airport =

Kufstein-Langkampfen Airport Flugplatz Kufstein-Langkampfen
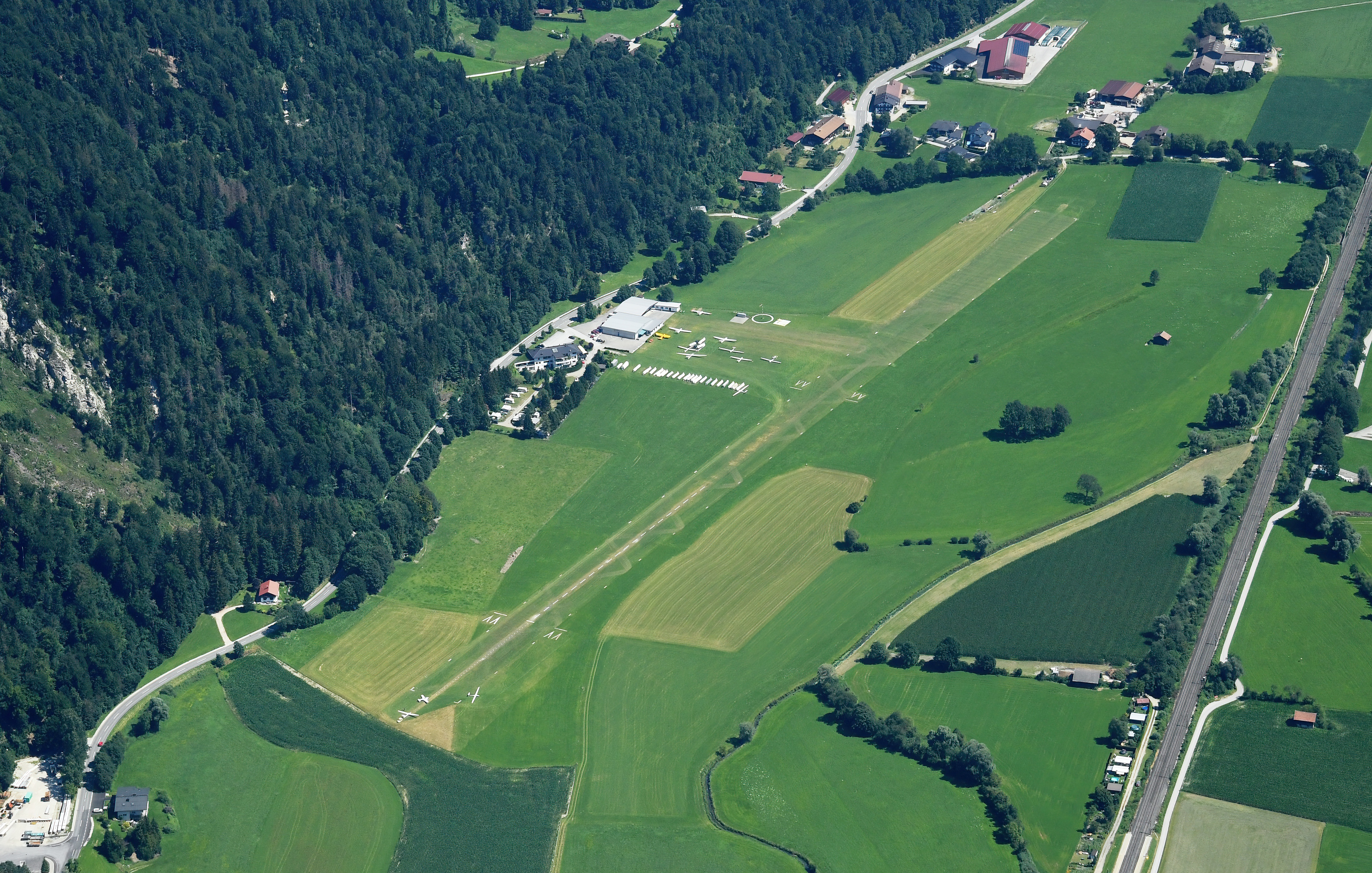
- IATA: none; ICAO: LOIK

Summary
- Airport type: Private
- Serves: Kufstein
- Location: Austria
- Elevation AMSL: 1,594 ft / 486 m
- Coordinates: 47°33′52.7″N 012°7′38.2″E

Map
- Location of Kufstein-Langkampfen Airport in Austria

Runways
Direction	Length		Surface
Direction	ft	m	Surface
05/23	2,730	832	Grass
- Source: Landings.com

Kufstein-Langkampfen Airport (German: Flugplatz Kufstein-Langkampfen, ICAO: LOIK) is a private use airport located 3 kilometres (2 mi) southwest of Kufstein, Tirol, Austria.

== See also ==
- List of airports in Austria
