= Völtendorf Airport =

Völtendorf Airport Flugplatz Völtendorf
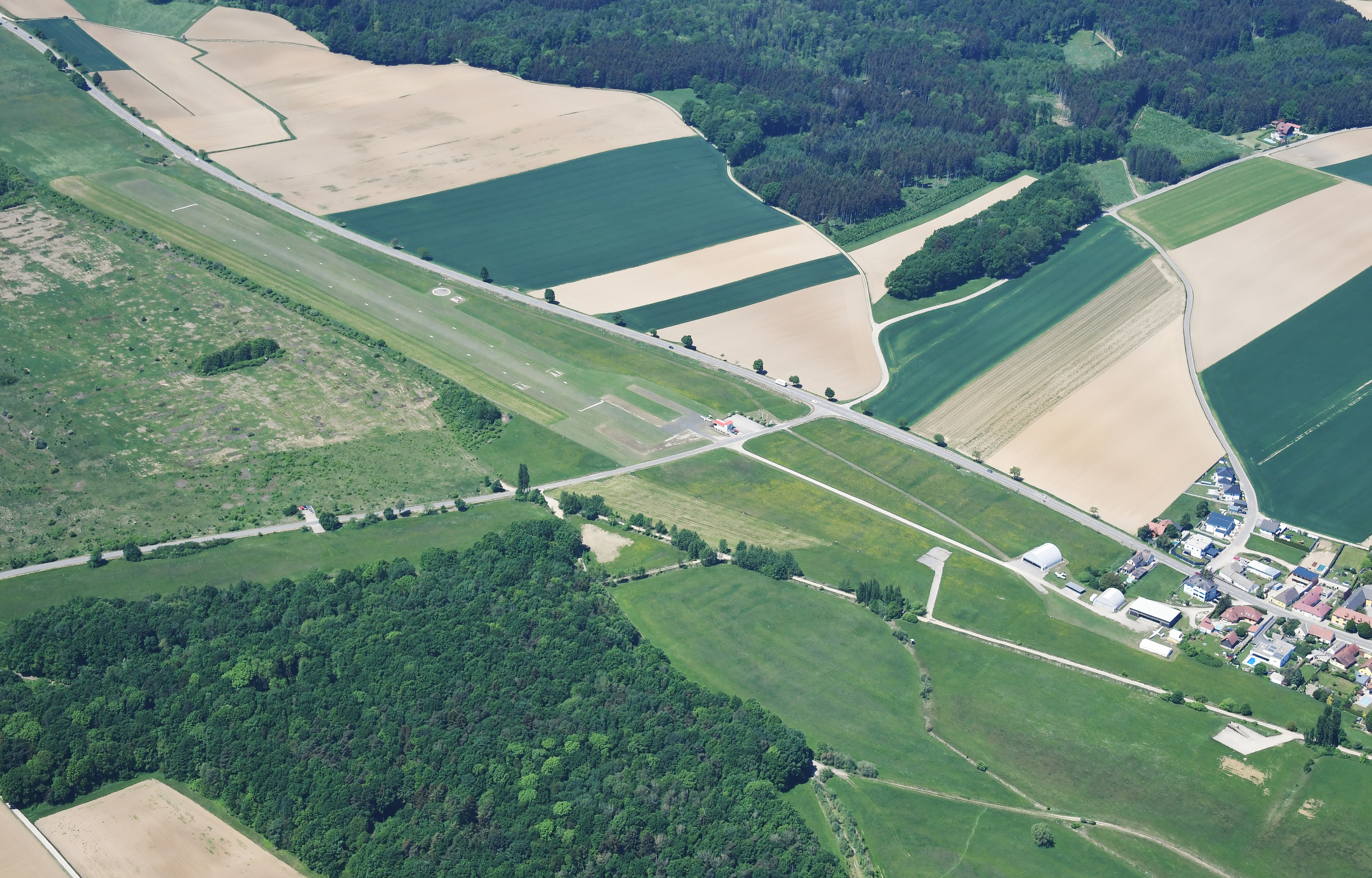
- IATA: none; ICAO: LOAD

Summary
- Airport type: Private
- Serves: Völtendorf
- Location: Austria
- Elevation AMSL: 1,062 ft / 324 m
- Coordinates: 48°9′36.9″N 015°35′16.3″E

Map
- Location of Völtendorf Airport in Austria

Runways
Direction	Length		Surface
Direction	ft	m	Surface
07/25	1,910	582	Grass
- Source: Landings.com

Völtendorf Airport (German: Flugplatz Völtendorf, ICAO: LOAD) is a private use airport located 0 kilometres (0 mi) west-southwest of Völtendorf, Lower Austria, Austria.

== See also ==
- List of airports in Austria
