= Niederöblarn Airport =

Niederöblarn Airport Flugplatz Niederöblarn
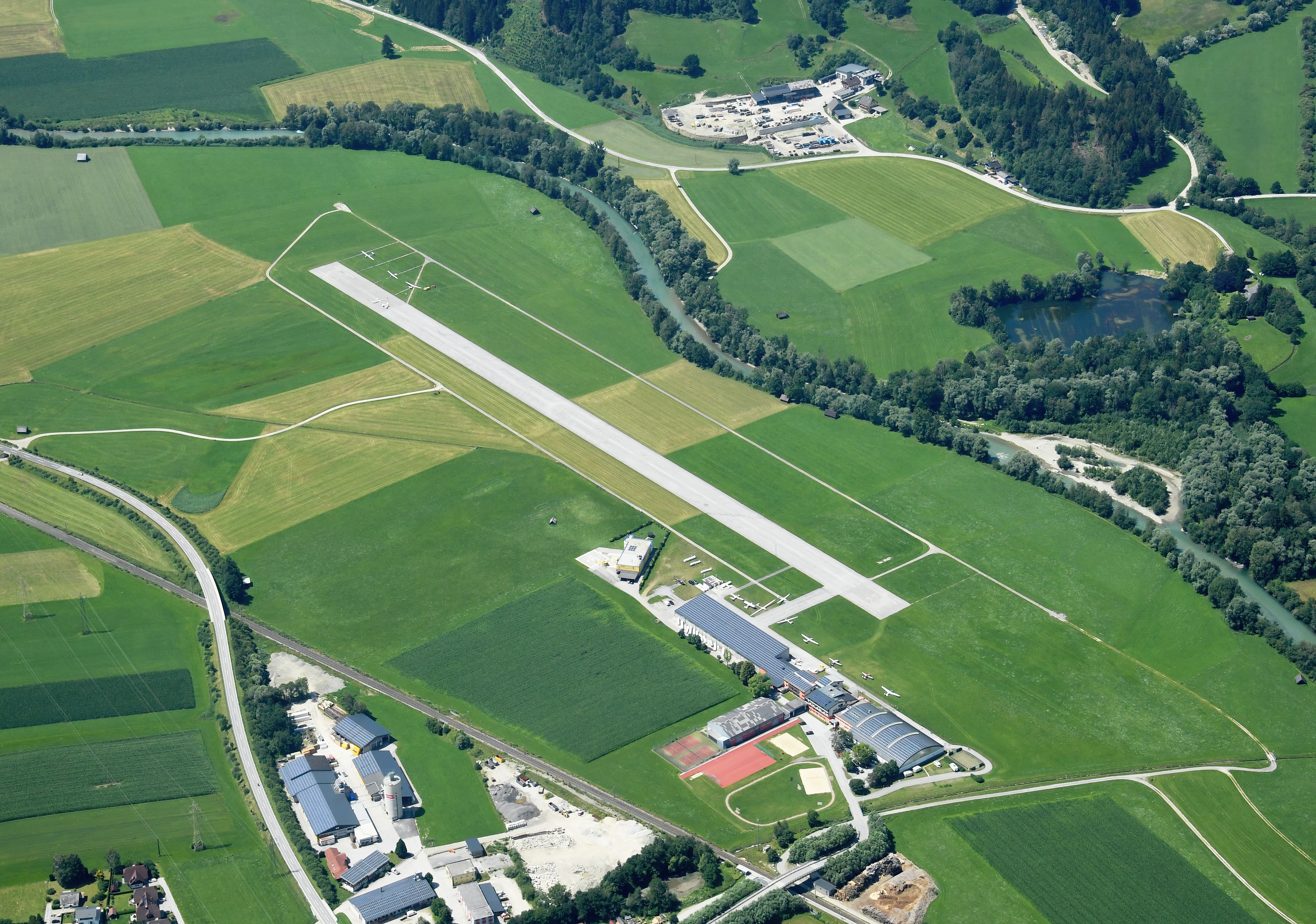
- IATA: none; ICAO: LOGO

Summary
- Airport type: Private
- Serves: Niederöblarn
- Location: Austria
- Elevation AMSL: 2,145 ft / 654 m
- Coordinates: 47°28′44.2″N 014°0′26.0″E

Map
- Location of Niederöblarn Airport in Austria

Runways
Direction	Length		Surface
Direction	ft	m	Surface
04/22	2,380	725	Asphalt
- Source: Landings.com

Niederöblarn Airport (German: Flugplatz Niederöblarn, ICAO: LOGO) is a private use airport located 1 kilometre (0.6 mi) west-northwest of Niederöblarn, Styria, Austria.

== See also ==
- List of airports in Austria
