= Wolfsberg Airfield =

Wolfsberg Airfield Flugplatz Wolfsberg
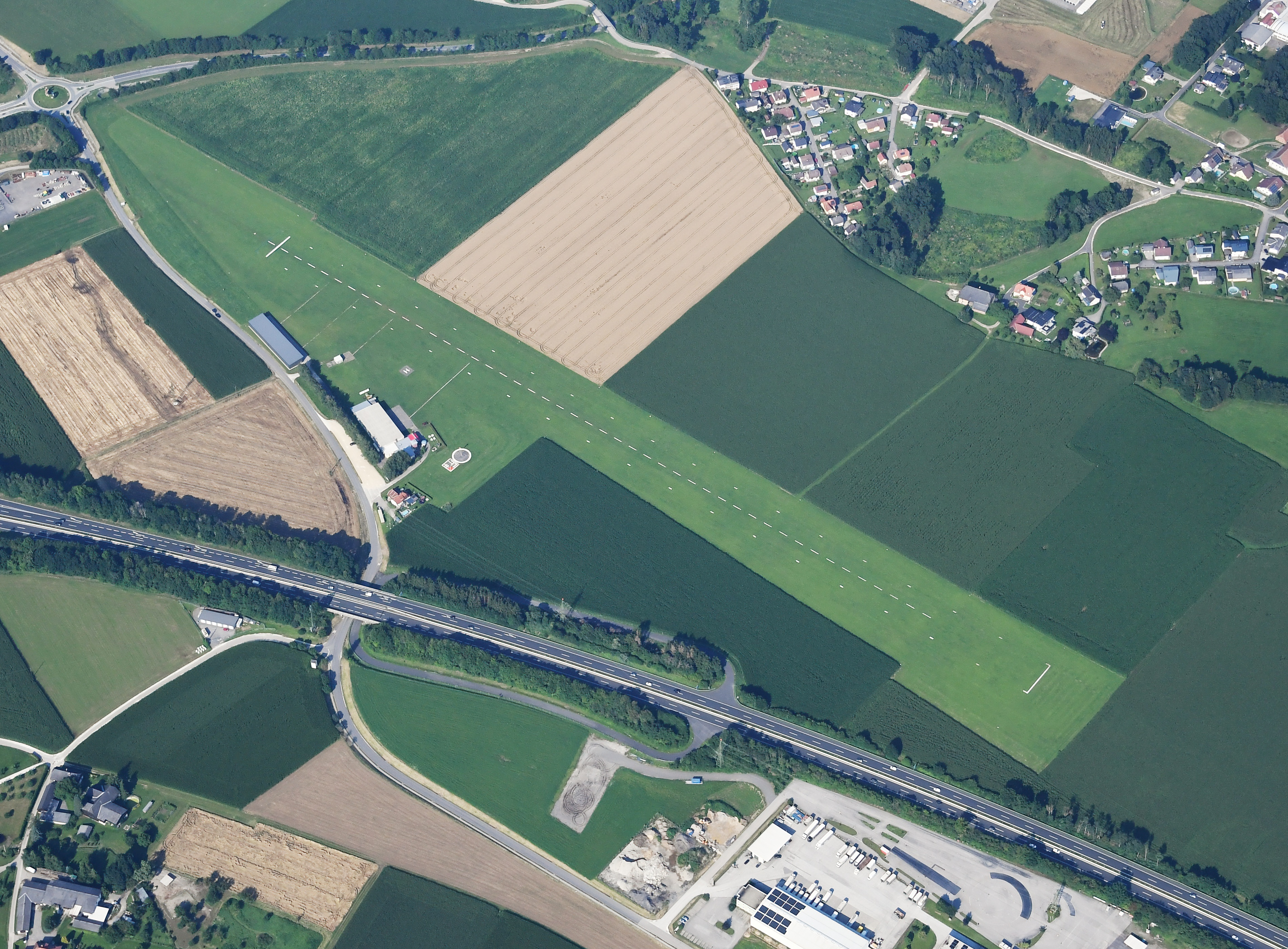
- IATA: none; ICAO: LOKW

Summary
- Airport type: Private
- Serves: Wolfsberg
- Location: Austria
- Elevation AMSL: 1,463 ft / 446 m
- Coordinates: 46°49′3.7″N 014°49′30.4″E

Map
- Location of Wolfsberg Airfield in Austria

Runways
Direction	Length		Surface
Direction	ft	m	Surface
18/36	2,450	747	Grass

Wolfsberg Airfield (German: Flugplatz Wolfsberg, ICAO: LOKW) is a private use aerodrome located near Wolfsberg, Carinthia, Austria.

== See also ==
- List of airports in Austria
