= Mayerhofen Airfield =

Mayerhofen Airfield Flugplatz Mayerhofen
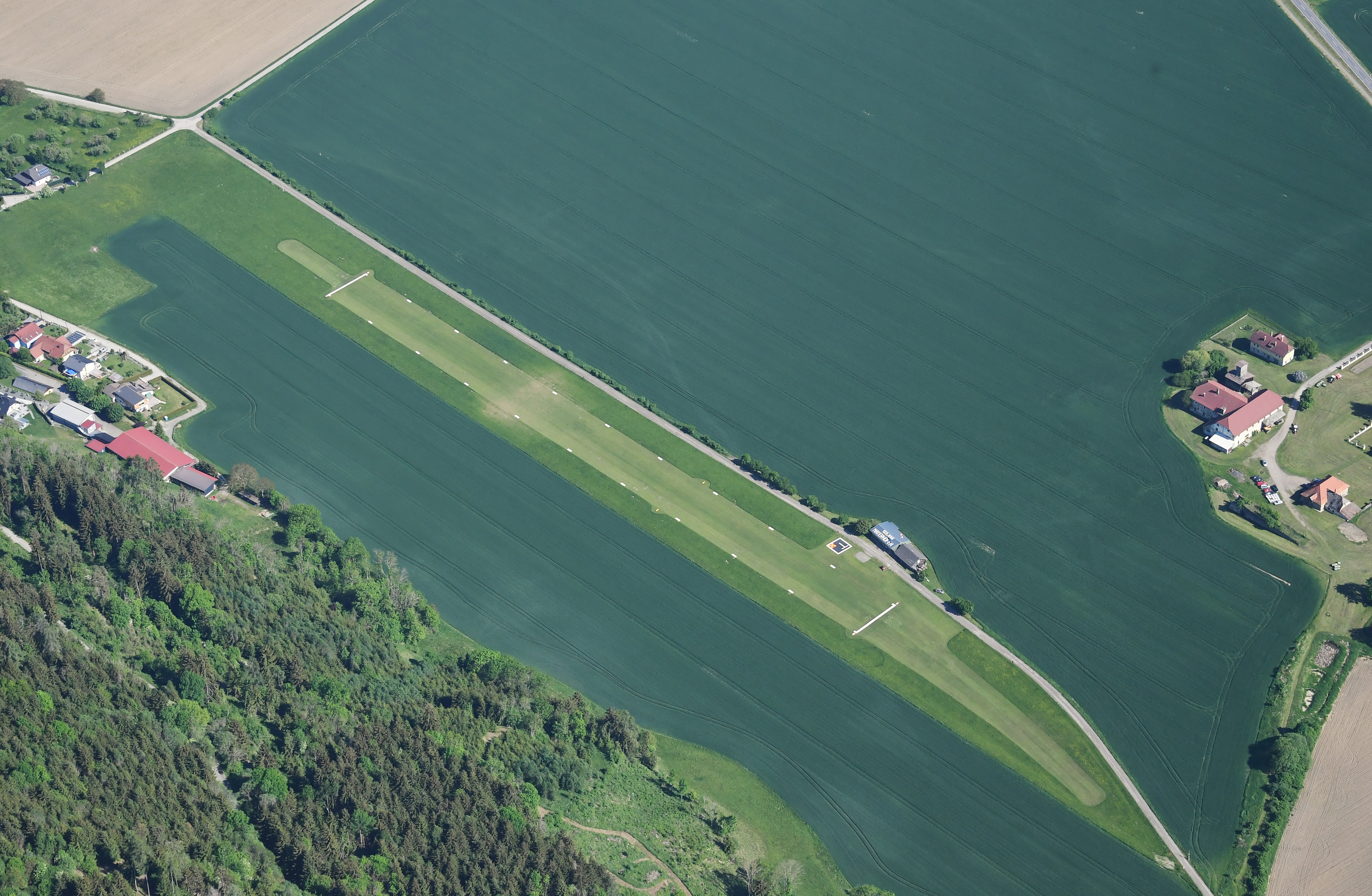
- IATA: none; ICAO: LOKM

Summary
- Airport type: Private
- Serves: Mayerhofen
- Location: Austria
- Elevation AMSL: 2,125 ft / 648 m
- Coordinates: 46°58′29.9″N 014°22′16.2″E

Map
- Location of Mayerhofen Airfield in Austria

Runways
Direction	Length		Surface
Direction	ft	m	Surface
08/26	1,300	396	Grass
- Source: Landings.com

Mayerhofen Airfield (German: Flugplatz Mayerhofen, ICAO: LOKM) is a private use general aviation aerodrome located near Mayerhofen, Carinthia, Austria.

== See also ==
- List of airports in Austria
