= Punitz-Güssing Airfield =

Punitz-Güssing Airfield Flugplatz Punitz-Güssing
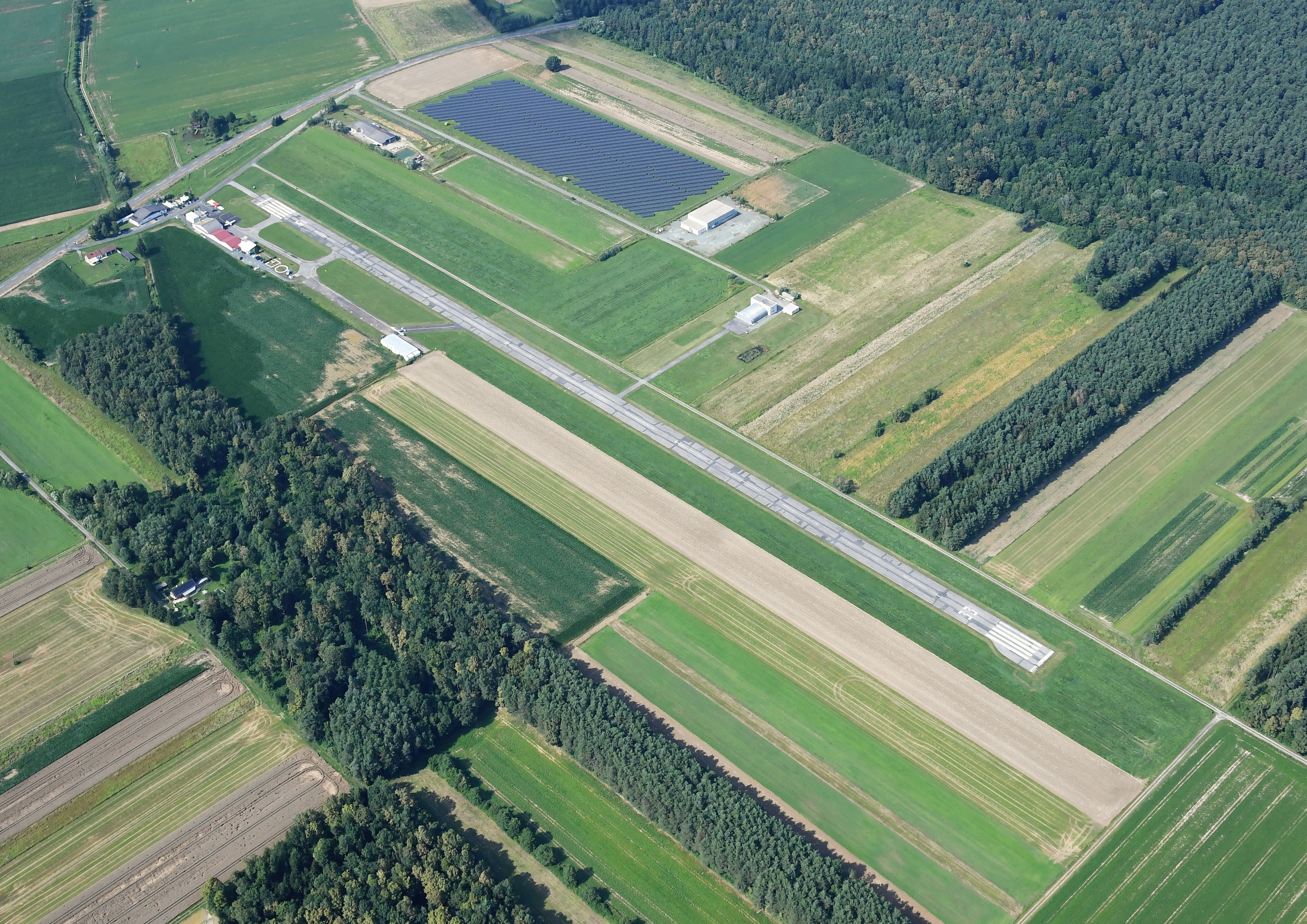
- IATA: none; ICAO: LOGG

Summary
- Airport type: Private
- Serves: Punitz
- Location: Austria
- Elevation AMSL: 951 ft (290 m)
- Coordinates: 47°08′49″N 016°19′00″E

Map
- Location of Punitz-Güssing Airfield in Austria

Runways
Direction	Length		Surface
Direction	ft	m	Surface
15/33	2,680	817	Asphalt

Punitz-Güssing Airfield (German: Flugplatz Punitz-Güssing, ICAO: LOGG) is a private use aerodrome located near Punitz, Burgenland, Austria.

== See also ==
- List of airports in Austria
