= Lienz-Nikolsdorf Airport =

Lienz-Nikolsdorf Airport Flugplatz Lienz-Nikolsdorf
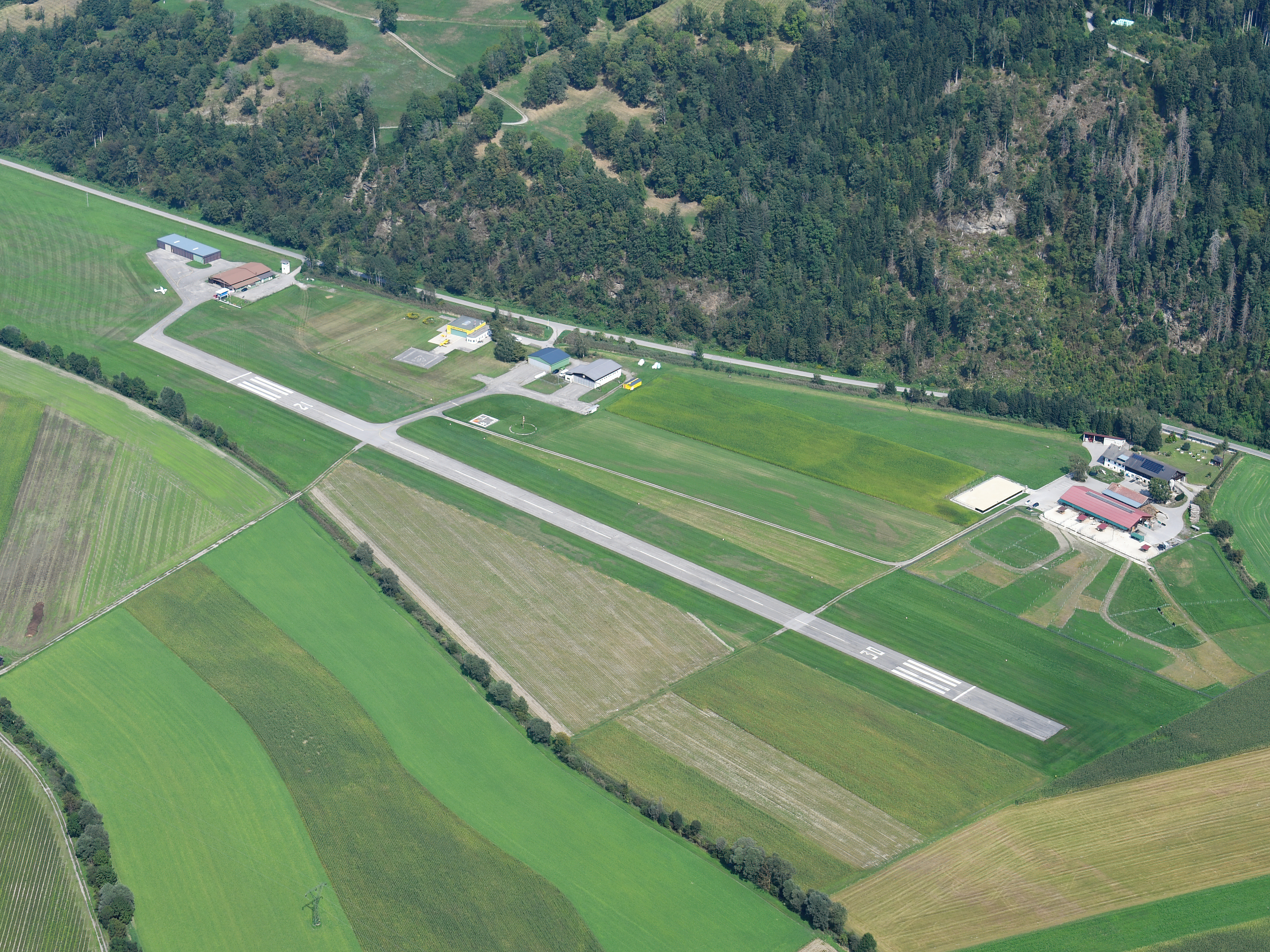
- IATA: none; ICAO: LOKL

Summary
- Airport type: Private
- Serves: Lienz
- Location: Austria
- Elevation AMSL: 2,096 ft / 639 m
- Coordinates: 46°47′53.4″N 012°52′41.3″E

Map
- Location of Lienz-Nikolsdorf Airport in Austria

Runways
Direction	Length		Surface
Direction	ft	m	Surface
12/30	2,040	622	Asphalt

Helipads
Number	Length		Surface
Number	ft	m	Surface
1	52	16	Asphalt
- Source: Landings.com

Lienz-Nikolsdorf Airport (German: Flugplatz Lienz-Nikolsdorf, ICAO: LOKL) is a private use airport located 9 kilometres (6 mi) east-southeast of Lienz, Tirol, Austria.

== See also ==
- List of airports in Austria
