= Hofkirchen Airfield =

Hofkirchen Airfield Flugplatz Hofkirchen
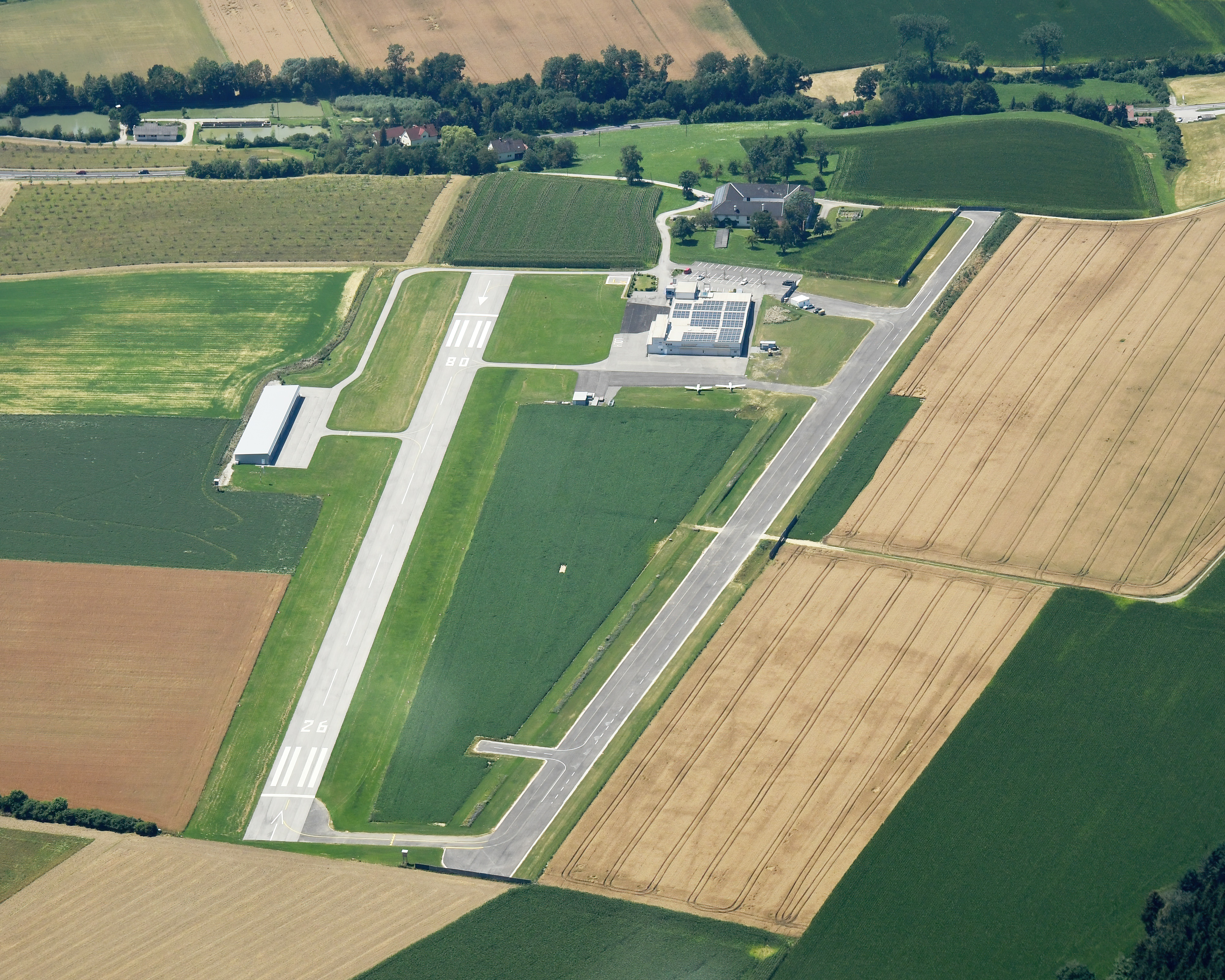
- IATA: none; ICAO: LOLH

Summary
- Airport type: Private
- Serves: Hofkirchen im Traunkreis
- Location: Austria
- Elevation AMSL: 1,171 ft / 357 m
- Coordinates: 48°8′20.7″N 014°20′8.9″E

Map
- Location of Hofkirchen in Austria

Runways
Direction	Length		Surface
Direction	ft	m	Surface
08/26	1,540	469	Grass
- Source: Landings.com

Hofkirchen Airfield (German: Flugplatz Hofkirchen, ICAO: LOLH) is a recreational aerodrome, located 3 kilometres (2 mi) west of Hofkirchen im Traunkreis, Oberösterreich, Austria.

== See also ==
- List of airports in Austria
