= Sankt Georgen Airport =

Airport in Austria

Sankt Georgen Airport Flugplatz Sankt Georgen
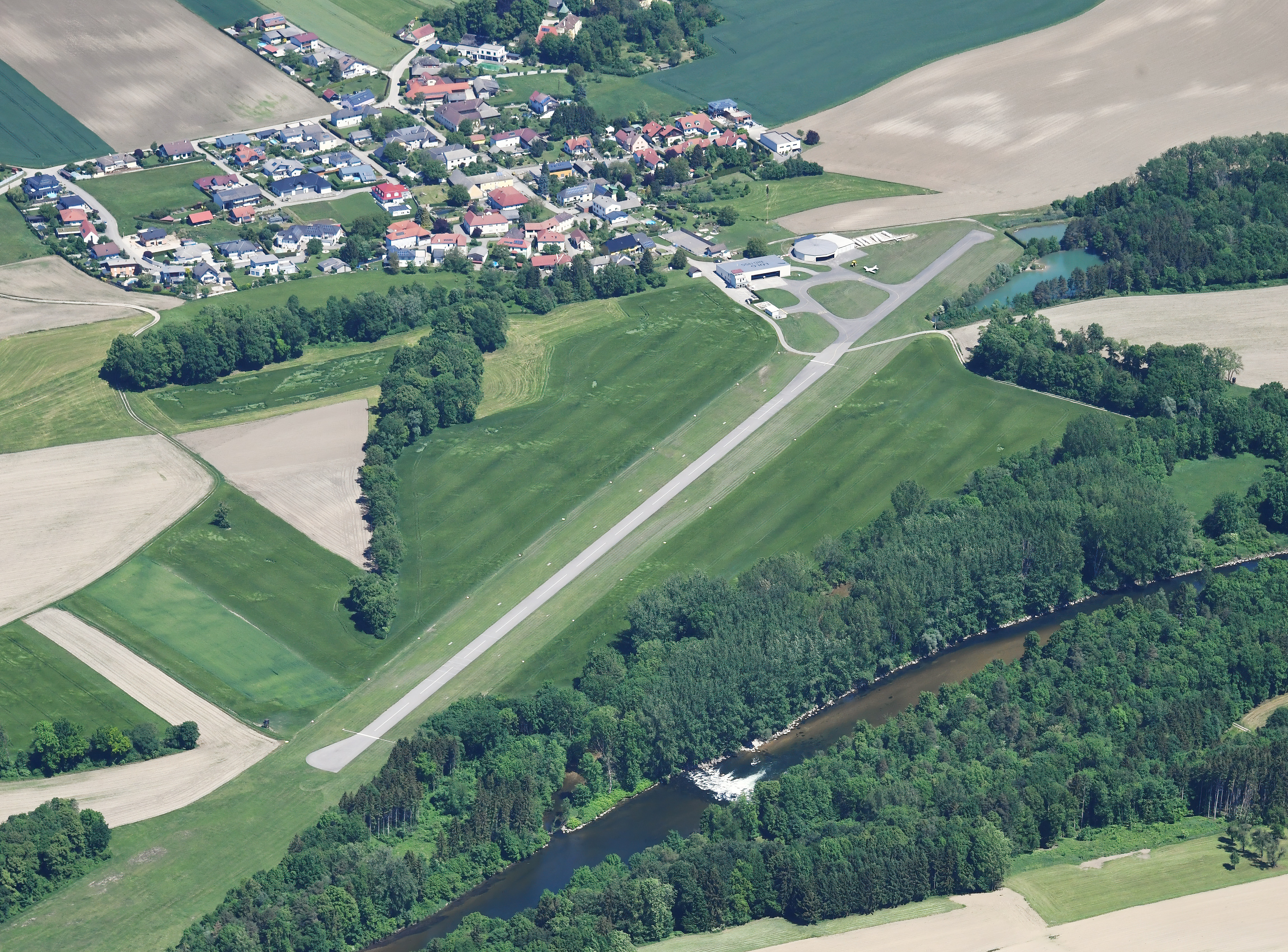
- IATA: none; ICAO: LOLG

Summary
- Airport type: Private
- Serves: Sankt Georgen am Ybbsfelde
- Location: Austria
- Elevation AMSL: 830 ft / 253 m
- Coordinates: 48°6′11.3″N 014°57′3.3″E

Map
- Location of Sankt Georgen am Ybbsfelde Airport in Austria

Runways
Direction	Length		Surface
Direction	ft	m	Surface
04/22	1,560	475	Asphalt
- Source: Landings.com

Sankt Georgen Airport (German: Flugplatz Sankt Georgen, ICAO: LOLG) is a private use airport located 3 kilometres (2 mi) south of Sankt Georgen am Ybbsfelde, Lower Austria, Austria.

== See also ==
- List of airports in Austria
