= Fürstenfeld Airport =

Fürstenfeld Airport Flugplatz Fürstenfeld
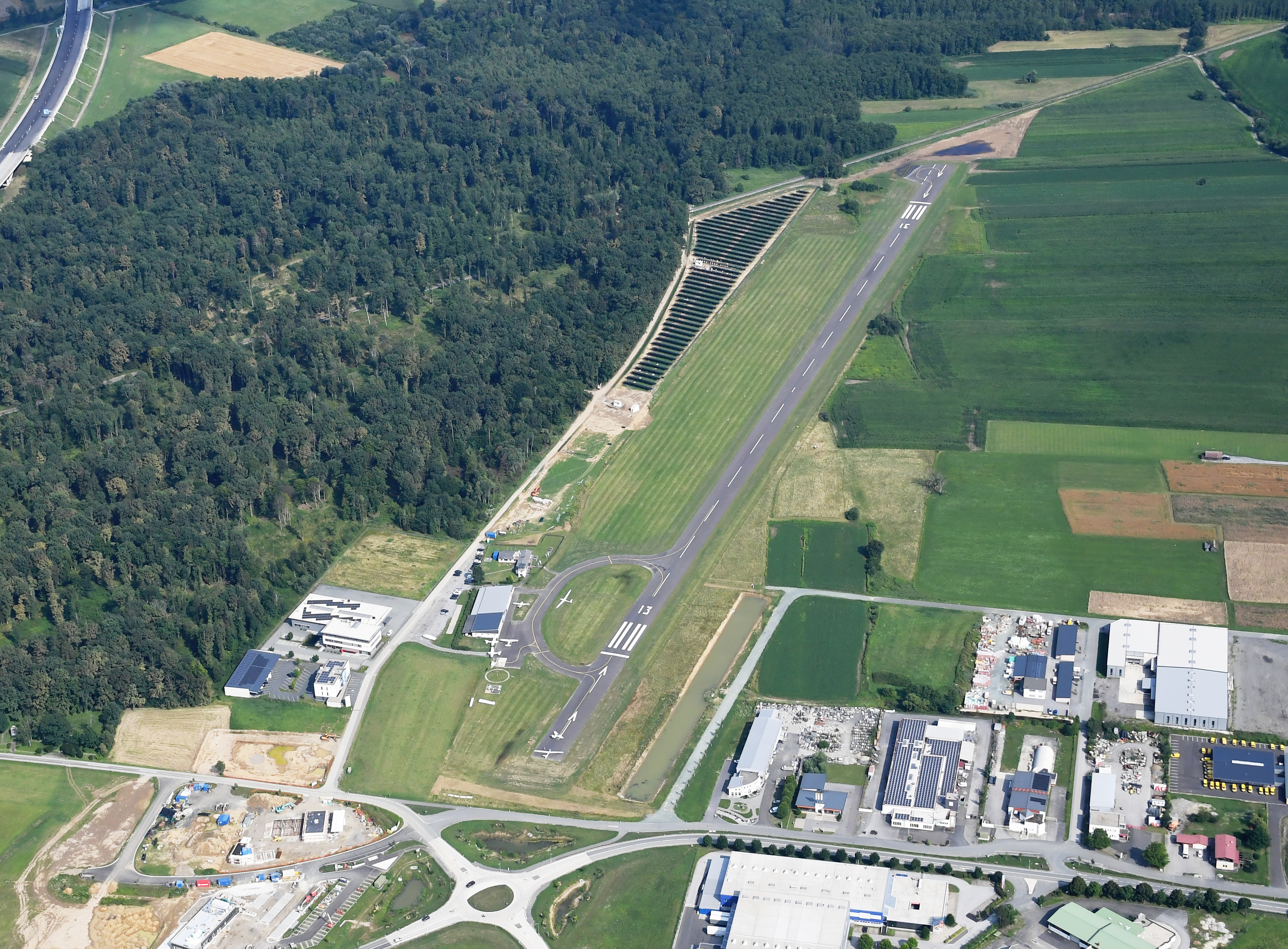
- IATA: none; ICAO: LOGF

Summary
- Airport type: Private
- Serves: Fürstenfeld
- Location: Austria
- Elevation AMSL: 830 ft / 253 m
- Coordinates: 47°3′43.2″N 016°5′1.5″E

Map
- Location of Fürstenfeld Airport in Austria

Runways
Direction	Length		Surface
Direction	ft	m	Surface
13/31	2,270	692	Asphalt
13L/31R	1,330	405	Grass
- Source: Landings.com

Fürstenfeld Airport (German: Flugplatz Fürstenfeld, ICAO: LOGF) is a private use airport located 2 kilometres (1.2 mi) north-northeast of Fürstenfeld, Steiermark, Austria.

== See also ==
- List of airports in Austria
