= Sankt Johann Airfield =

Sankt Johann Airfield Flugplatz Sankt Johann
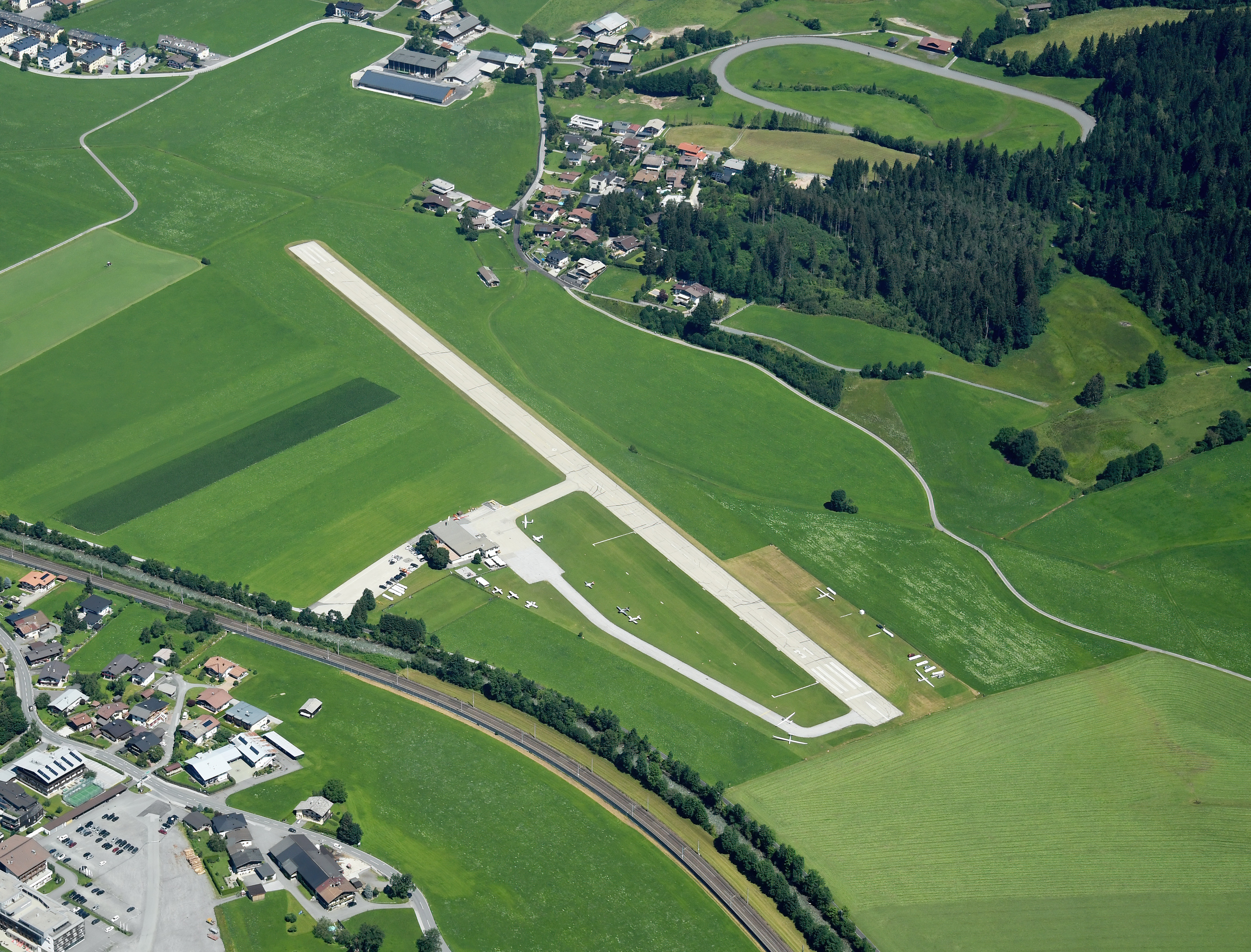
- IATA: none; ICAO: LOIJ

Summary
- Airport type: Public
- Serves: Sankt Johann in Tirol
- Location: Austria
- Elevation AMSL: 2,211 ft / 674 m
- Coordinates: 47°31′13.1″N 012°26′57.7″E

Map
- Location of Sankt Johann Airfield in Austria

Runways
Direction	Length		Surface
Direction	ft	m	Surface
13/31	2,440	744	Asphalt
13C/31C	2,610	796	Grass
13R/31L	840	256	Grass

Sankt Johann Airfield (German: Flugplatz Sankt Johann, ICAO: LOIJ) is a recreational aerodrome located 1 kilometre (1 mi) east of Sankt Johann in Tirol, Tyrol, Austria.

== See also ==
- List of airports in Austria
