= Lanzen-Turnau Airport =

Lanzen-Turnau Airport Flugplatz Lanzen-Turnau
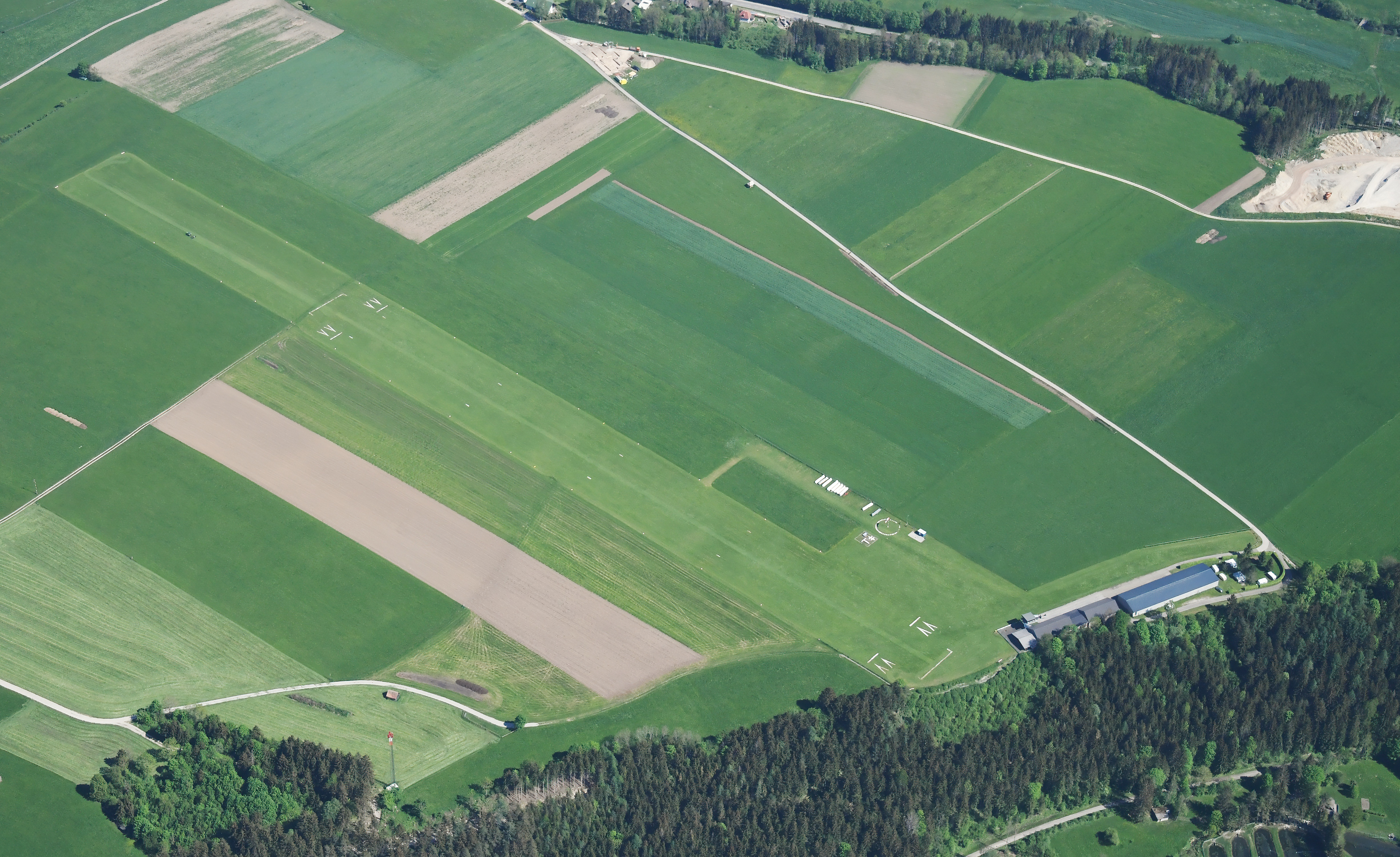
- IATA: none; ICAO: LOGL

Summary
- Airport type: Private
- Serves: Turnau
- Location: Austria
- Elevation AMSL: 2,588 ft / 789 m
- Coordinates: 47°33′23.1″N 015°19′18.0″E

Map
- Location of Lanzen-Turnau Airport in Austria

Runways
Direction	Length		Surface
Direction	ft	m	Surface
07/25	2,330	710	Grass
- Source: Landings.com

Lanzen-Turnau Airport (German: Flugplatz Lanzen-Turnau, ICAO: LOGL) is a private use airport located 1 kilometre (1 mi) west of Turnau, Styria, Austria.

== See also ==
- List of airports in Austria
