= Kapfenberg Airport =

Kapfenberg Airport Flugplatz Kapfenberg
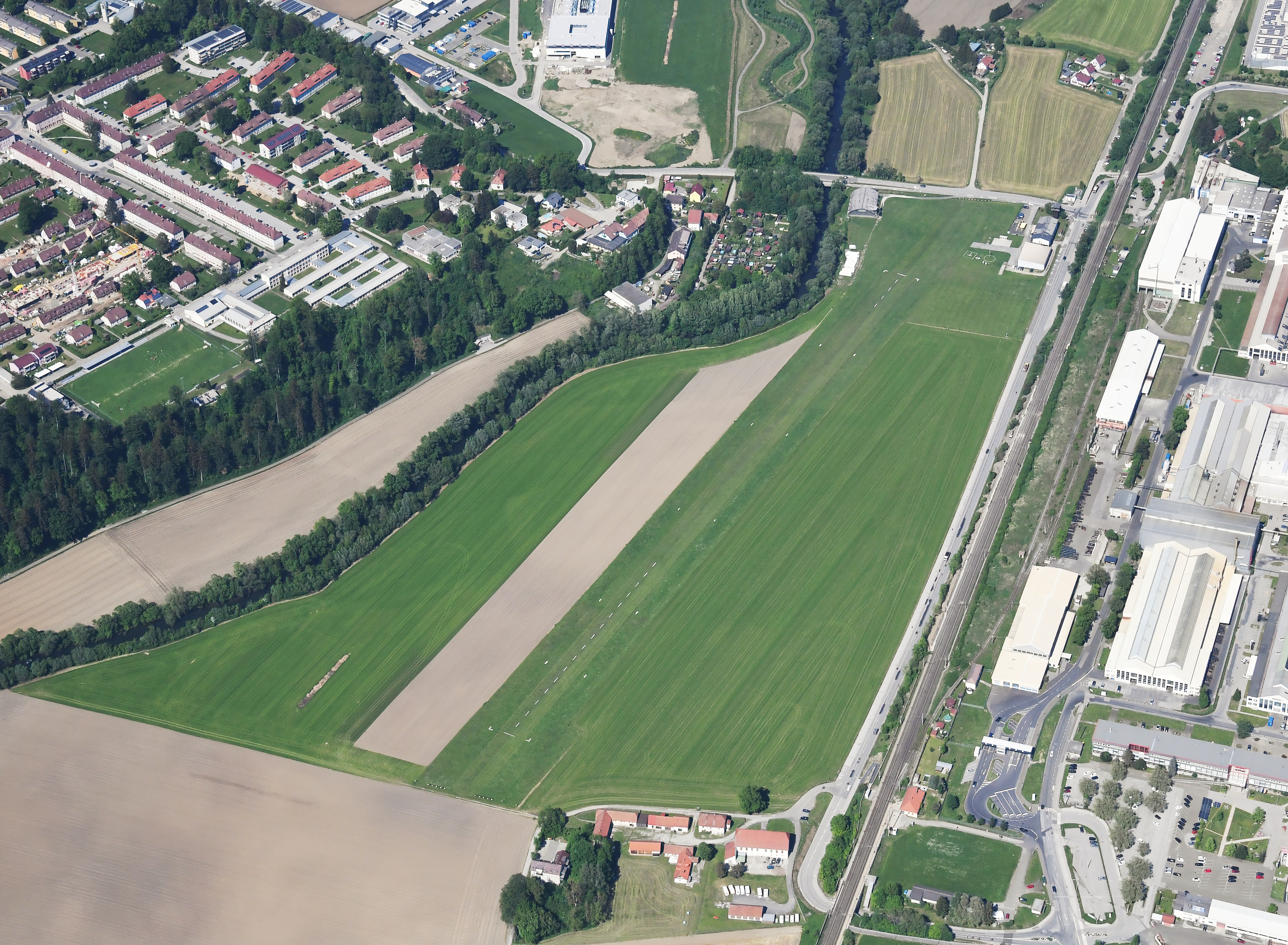
- IATA: none; ICAO: LOGK

Summary
- Airport type: Public
- Serves: Kapfenberg
- Location: Austria
- Elevation AMSL: 1,729 ft / 527 m
- Coordinates: 47°27′27.4″N 015°19′53.5″E

Map
- Location of Kapfenberg Airport in Austria

Runways
Direction	Length		Surface
Direction	ft	m	Surface
07/25	2,420	738	Grass
- Source: Landings.com

Kapfenberg Airport (German: Flugplatz Kapfenberg, ICAO: LOGK) is a public use airport located 3 kilometres (2 mi) east of Kapfenberg, Steiermark, Austria.

== See also ==
- List of airports in Austria
