= Leoben/Timmersdorf Airfield =

Leoben/Timmersdorf Airfield Flugplatz Leoben/Timmersdorf
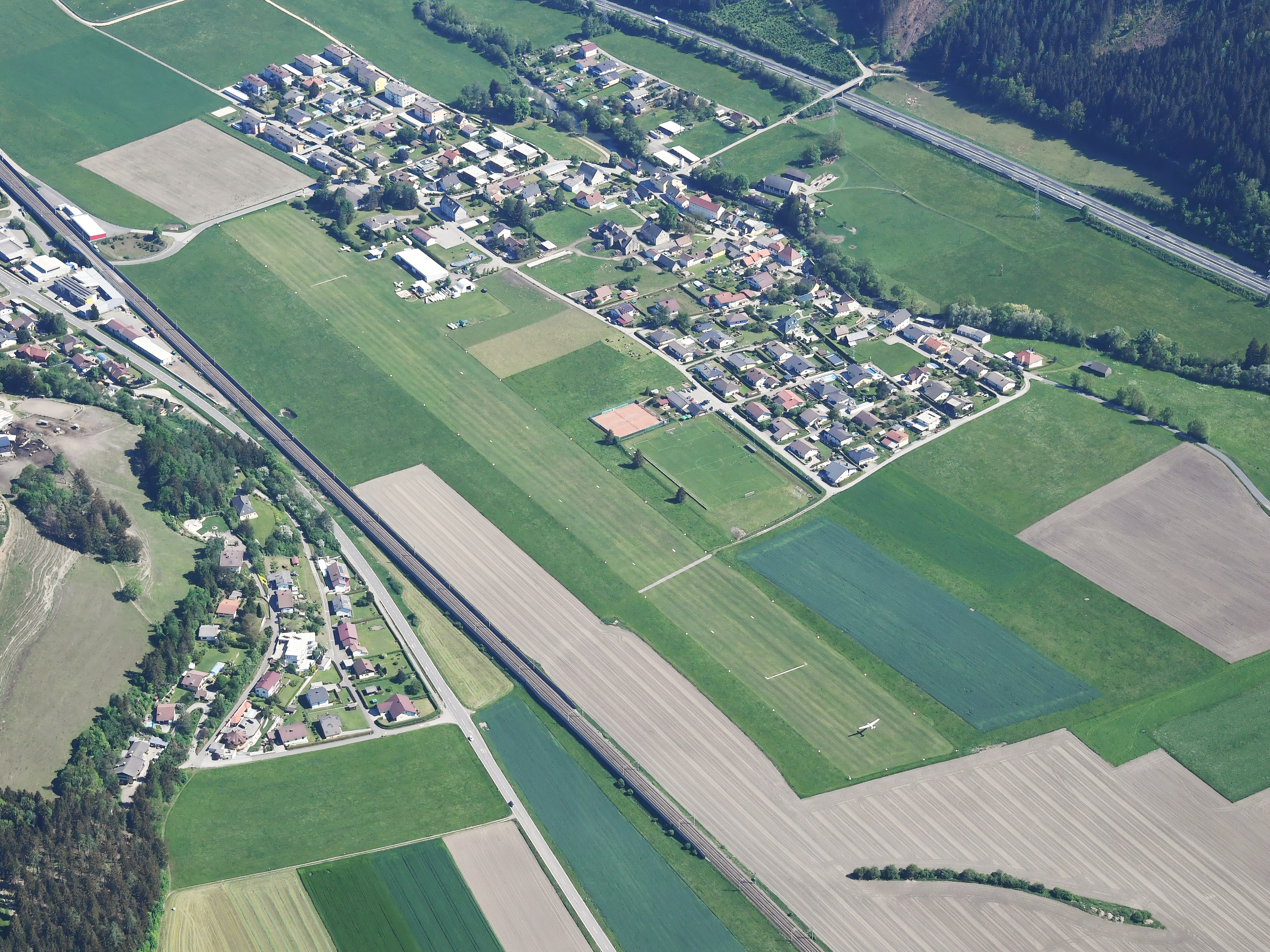
- IATA: none; ICAO: LOGT

Summary
- Airport type: Private
- Serves: Timmersdorf
- Location: Austria
- Elevation AMSL: 2,066 ft / 630 m
- Coordinates: 47°22′46.9″N 014°57′50.3″E

Map
- Location of Leoben/Timmersdorf Airfield in Austria

Runways
Direction	Length		Surface
Direction	ft	m	Surface
11/29	2,030	619	Grass
- Source: Landings.com

Leoben/Timmersdorf Airfield (German: Flugplatz Leoben/Timmersdorf, ICAO: LOGT) is a private use airfield located 1 kilometre (1 mi) west of Timmersdorf, Styria, Austria.

== See also ==
- List of airports in Austria
