= Schärding-Suben Airport =

Schärding-Suben Airport Flugplatz Schärding-Suben
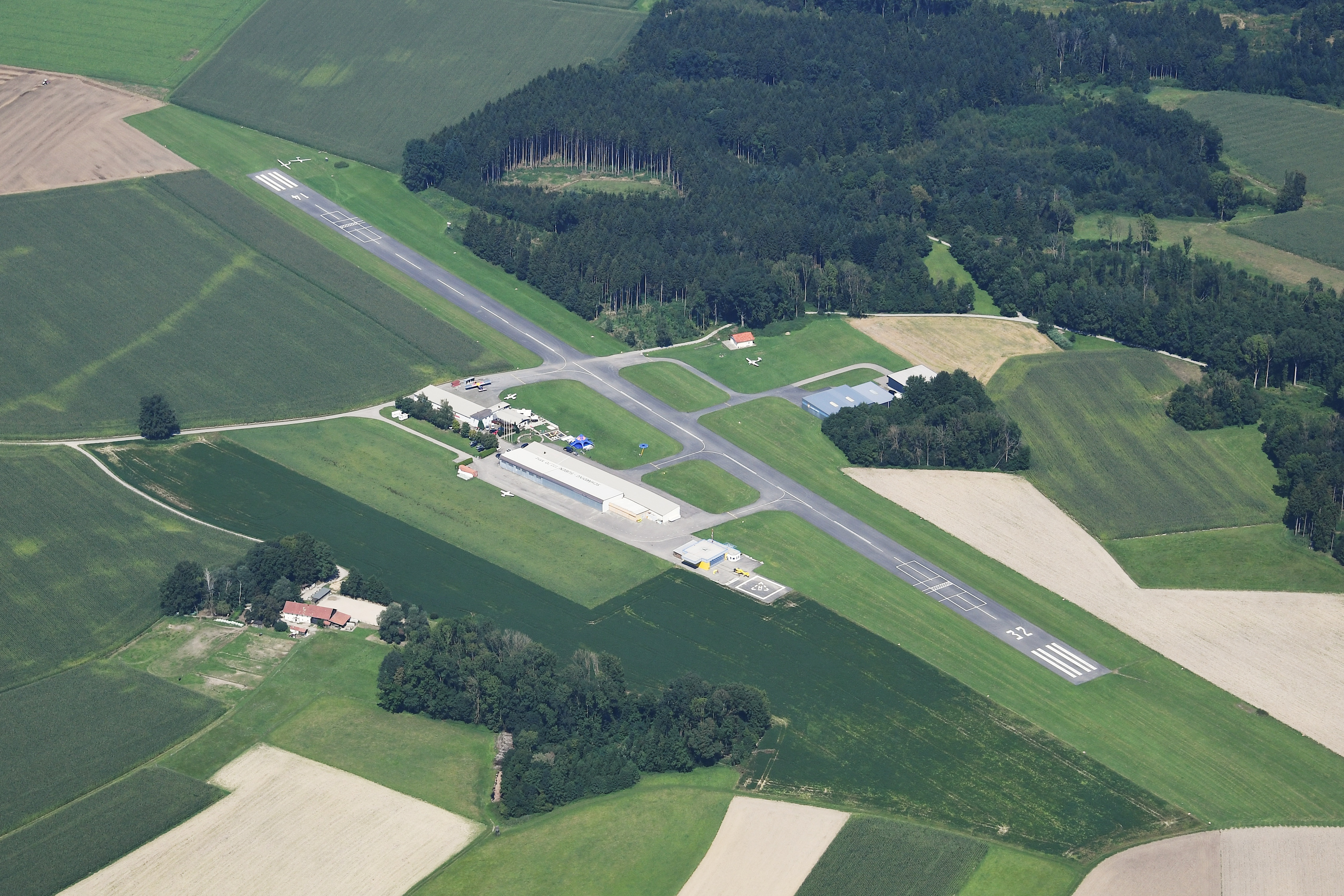
- IATA: none; ICAO: LOLS

Summary
- Airport type: Private
- Serves: Schärding
- Location: Austria
- Elevation AMSL: 1,072 ft / 327 m
- Coordinates: 48°24′10.5″N 013°26′54.0″E

Map
- Location of Schärding-Suben Airport in Austria

Runways
Direction	Length		Surface
Direction	ft	m	Surface
14/32	2,630	802	Asphalt
- Source: Landings.com

Schärding-Suben Airport (German: Flugplatz Schärding-Suben, ICAO: LOLS) is a private use airport located 7 kilometres (4 mi) south of Schärding, Upper Austria, Austria.

== See also ==
- List of airports in Austria
