= Freistadt Airport =

Freistadt Airport Flugplatz Freistadt
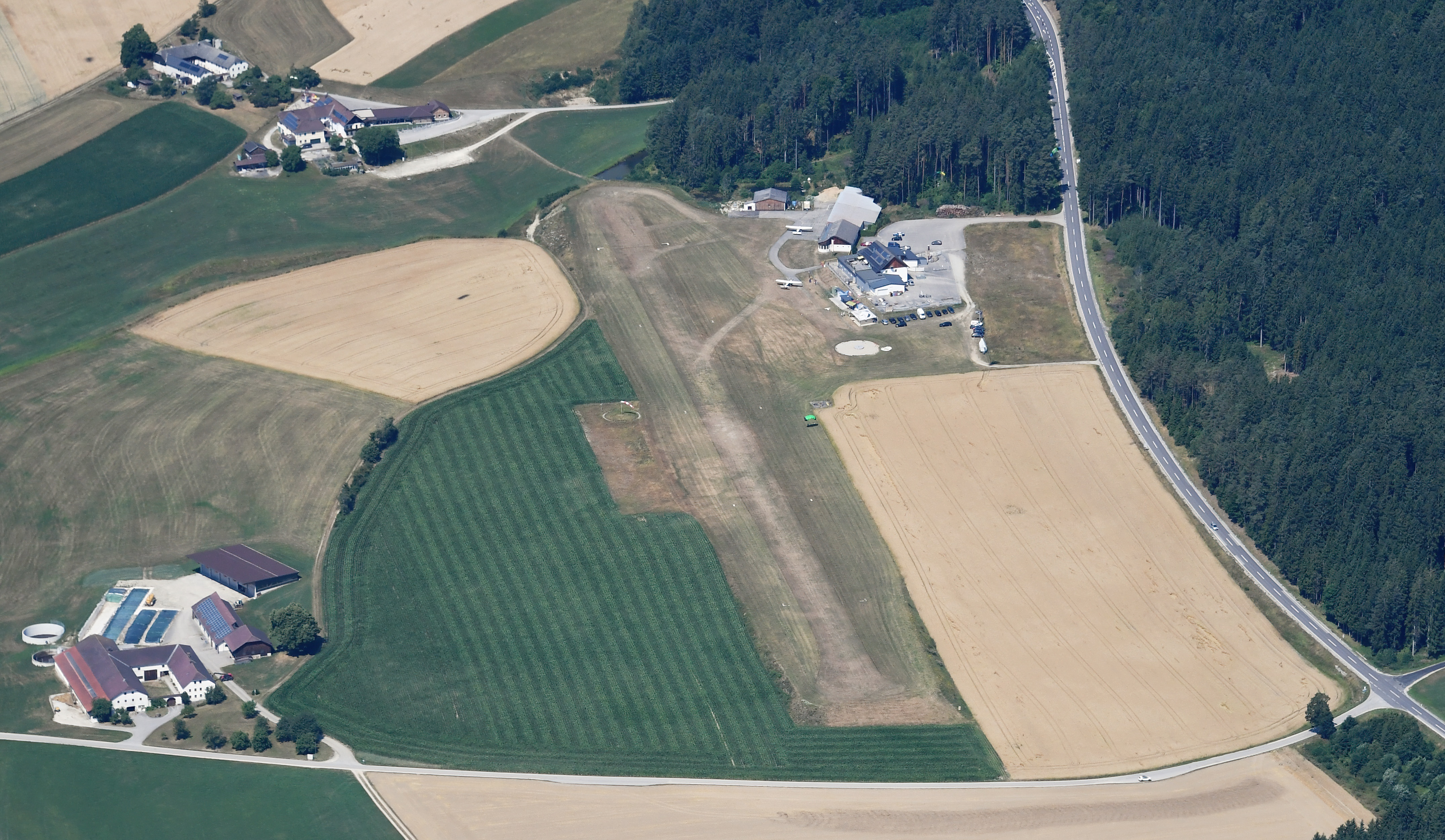
- IATA: none; ICAO: LOLF

Summary
- Airport type: Private
- Serves: Freistadt
- Location: Austria
- Elevation AMSL: 2,247 ft / 685 m
- Coordinates: 48°30′49.6″N 014°24′23.1″E

Map
- Location of Freistadt Airport in Austria

Runways
Direction	Length		Surface
Direction	ft	m	Surface
10/28	1,780	543	Grass
- Source: Landings.com

Freistadt Airport (German: Flugplatz Freistadt, ICAO: LOLF) is a private use airport located 7 kilometres (4.3 mi) west of Freistadt, Oberösterreich, Austria.

== See also ==
- List of airports in Austria
