= Ferlach-Glainach Airport =

Glainach-Ferlach Airport Flugplatz Glainach-Ferlach
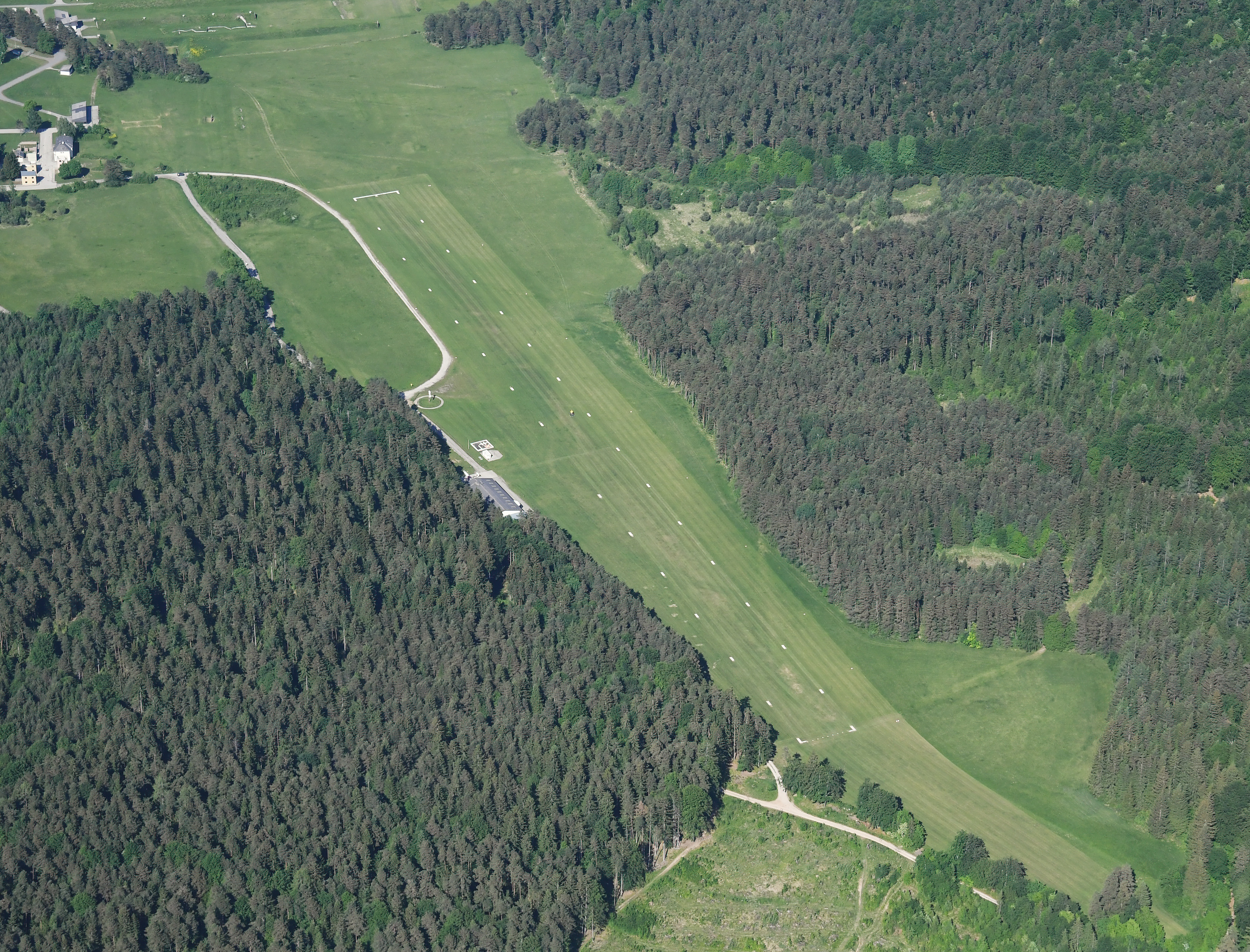
- IATA: none; ICAO: LOKG

Summary
- Airport type: Public
- Serves: Ferlach
- Location: Austria
- Elevation AMSL: 1,502 ft / 458 m
- Coordinates: 46°31′58.0″N 014°19′51.1″E

Map
- Location of Glainach-Ferlach Airport in Austria

Runways
Direction	Length		Surface
Direction	ft	m	Surface
04/22	2,020	616	Grass
- Source: Landings.com

Glainach-Ferlach Airport (German: Flugplatz Glainach-Ferlach, ICAO: LOKG) is a public use airport located 3 kilometres (2 mi) east-northeast of Ferlach, Kärnten, Austria.

== See also ==
- List of airports in Austria
