= Gmunden Laakirchen Airfield =

Gmunden Laakirchen Airfield Flugplatz Gmunden Laakirchen
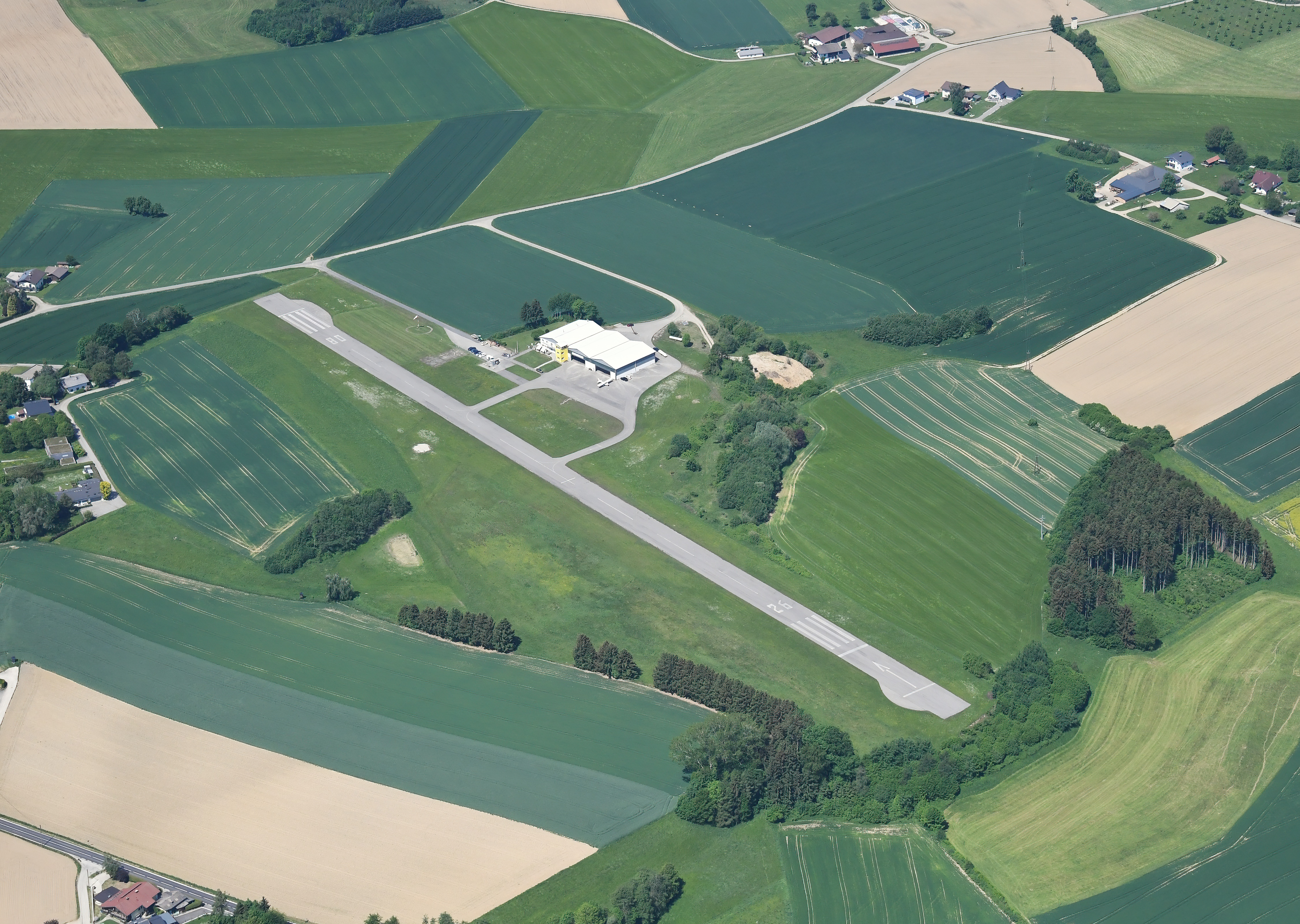
- IATA: none; ICAO: LOLU

Summary
- Airport type: Private
- Serves: Gmunden
- Location: Austria
- Elevation AMSL: 1,673 ft / 510 m
- Coordinates: 47°57′5.6″N 013°52′2.1″E

Map
- Location of Gmunden Laakirchen Airfield in Austria

Runways
Direction	Length		Surface
Direction	ft	m	Surface
08/26	1,940	591	Asphalt
- Source: Landings.com

Gmunden Laakirchen Airfield (German: Flugplatz Gmunden Laakirchen, ICAO: LOLU) is a recreational airfield located 6 kilometres (3.7 mi) northeast of Gmunden, Oberösterreich, Austria.

== See also ==
- List of airports in Austria
