= Dobersberg Airport =

Dobersberg Airport Flugplatz Dobersberg
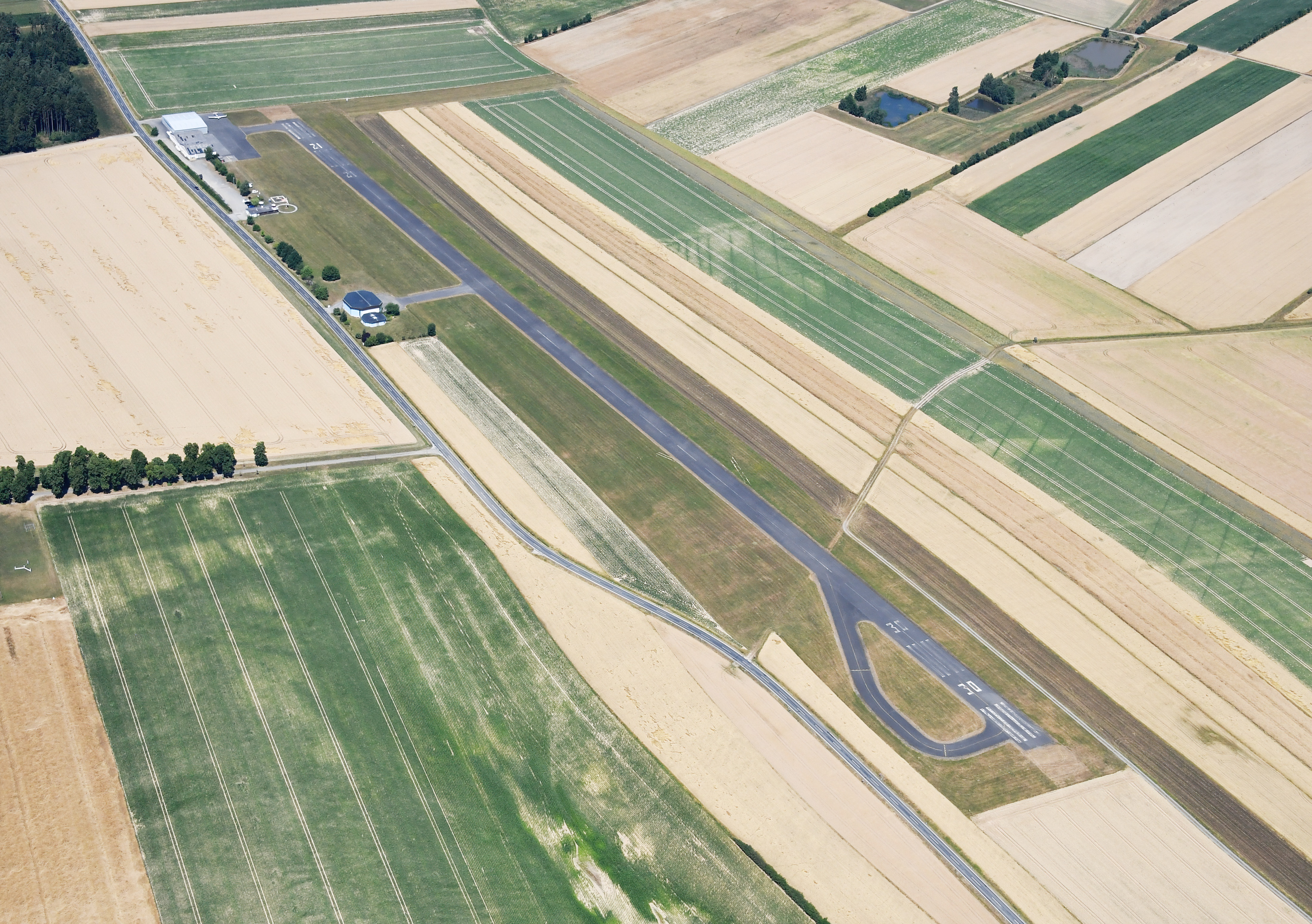
- IATA: none; ICAO: LOAB

Summary
- Airport type: Private
- Serves: Dobersberg
- Location: Austria
- Elevation AMSL: 1,725 ft / 526 m
- Coordinates: 48°55′19.7″N 015°17′48.7″E

Map
- Location of Dobersberg Airport in Austria

Runways
Direction	Length		Surface
Direction	ft	m	Surface
12/30	2,830	863	Asphalt
- Source: Landings.com

Dobersberg Airport (German: Flugplatz Dobersberg, ICAO: LOAB) is a private use airport located 2 kilometres (1.2 mi) west-northwest of Dobersberg, Lower Austria, Austria.

== See also ==
- List of airports in Austria
