= Schwaz Heliport =

- IATA: none; ICAO: LOXS

Summary
- Airport type: Public
- Serves: Schwaz
- Location: Austria
- Elevation AMSL: 1,781 ft / 543 m
- Coordinates: 47°20′6.0″N 11°41′51.2″E

Map
- Location of Schwaz Heliport in Austria

Helipads
Number	Length		Surface
Number	m	ft	Surface
1	33	108	Grass
- Source: Landings.com

Schwaz Heliport (ICAO: LOXS) is a public use heliport located 15 nm north-northwest of Schwaz, Tirol, Austria.

== See also ==
- List of airports in Austria
