= Reutte-Höfen Airfield =

Airfield in Austria

Reutte-Höfen Airfield Flugplatz Reutte-Höfen
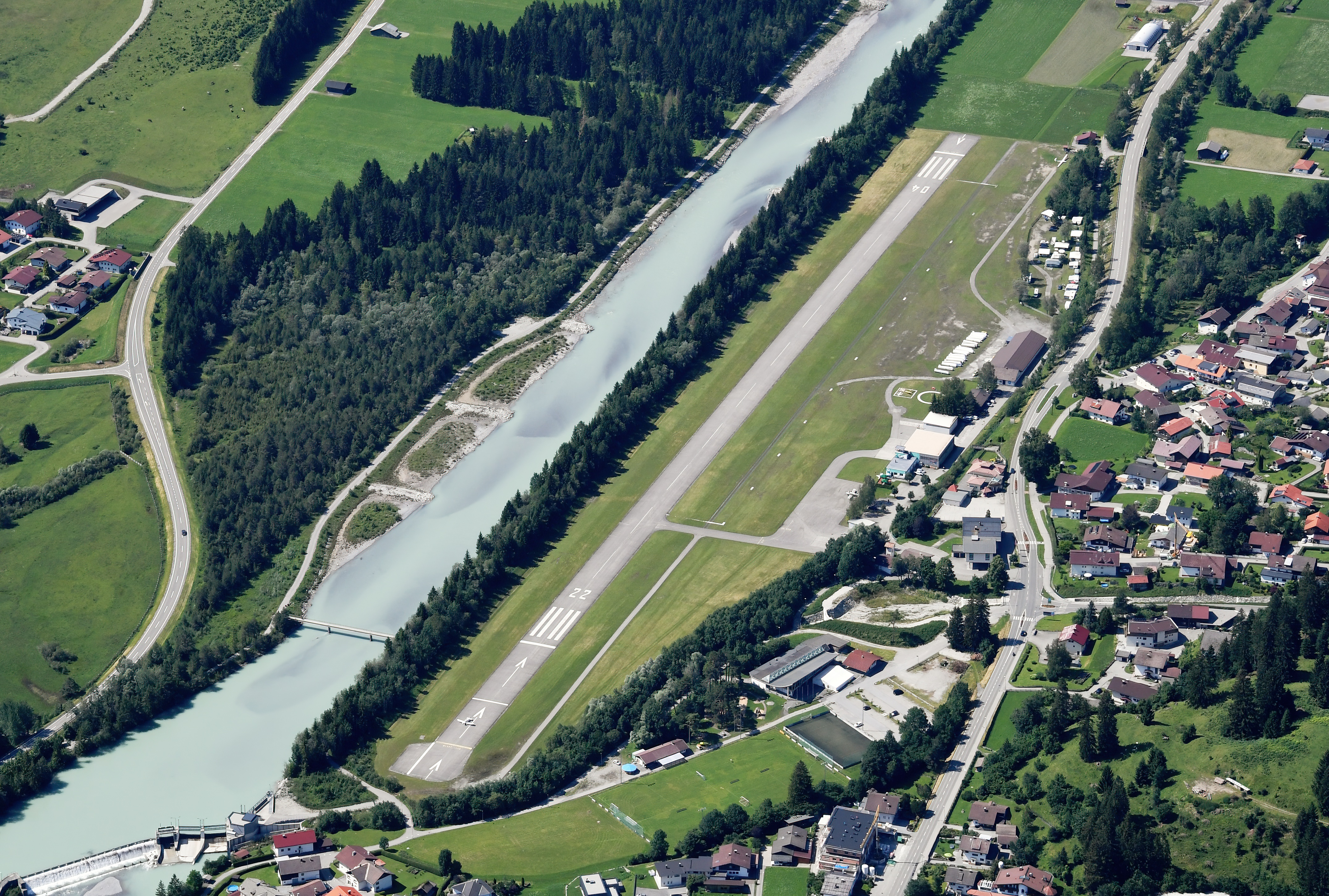
- IATA: none; ICAO: LOIR

Summary
- Airport type: Private
- Serves: Reutte
- Location: Austria
- Elevation AMSL: 2,808 ft / 856 m
- Coordinates: 47°28′16.4″N 010°41′30.0″E

Map
- Location of Reutte-Höfen Airfield in Austria

Runways
Direction	Length		Surface
Direction	ft	m	Surface
04/22	2,310	704	Grass

Reutte-Höfen Airfield (German: Flugplatz Reutte-Höfen, ICAO: LOIR) is a recreational airfield near Reutte, Tyrol, Austria.

== See also ==
- List of airports in Austria
