= Retzer Land Heliport =

- IATA: none; ICAO: none

Summary
- Airport type: Private
- Serves: Retz
- Location: Austria
- Elevation AMSL: 800 ft / 244 m
- Coordinates: 48°45′16.0″N 15°57′43.7″E

Map
- Location of Retzer Land Heliport in Austria

Helipads
Number	Length		Surface
Number	m	ft	Surface
1	16	52	Gravel
- Source: Landings.com

Retzer Land Heliport is a private-use heliport in Retz, Niederösterreich, Austria.

== See also ==
- List of airports in Austria
