= Krems-Langenlois Airport =

Krems-Langenlois Airport Flugplatz Krems-Langenlois
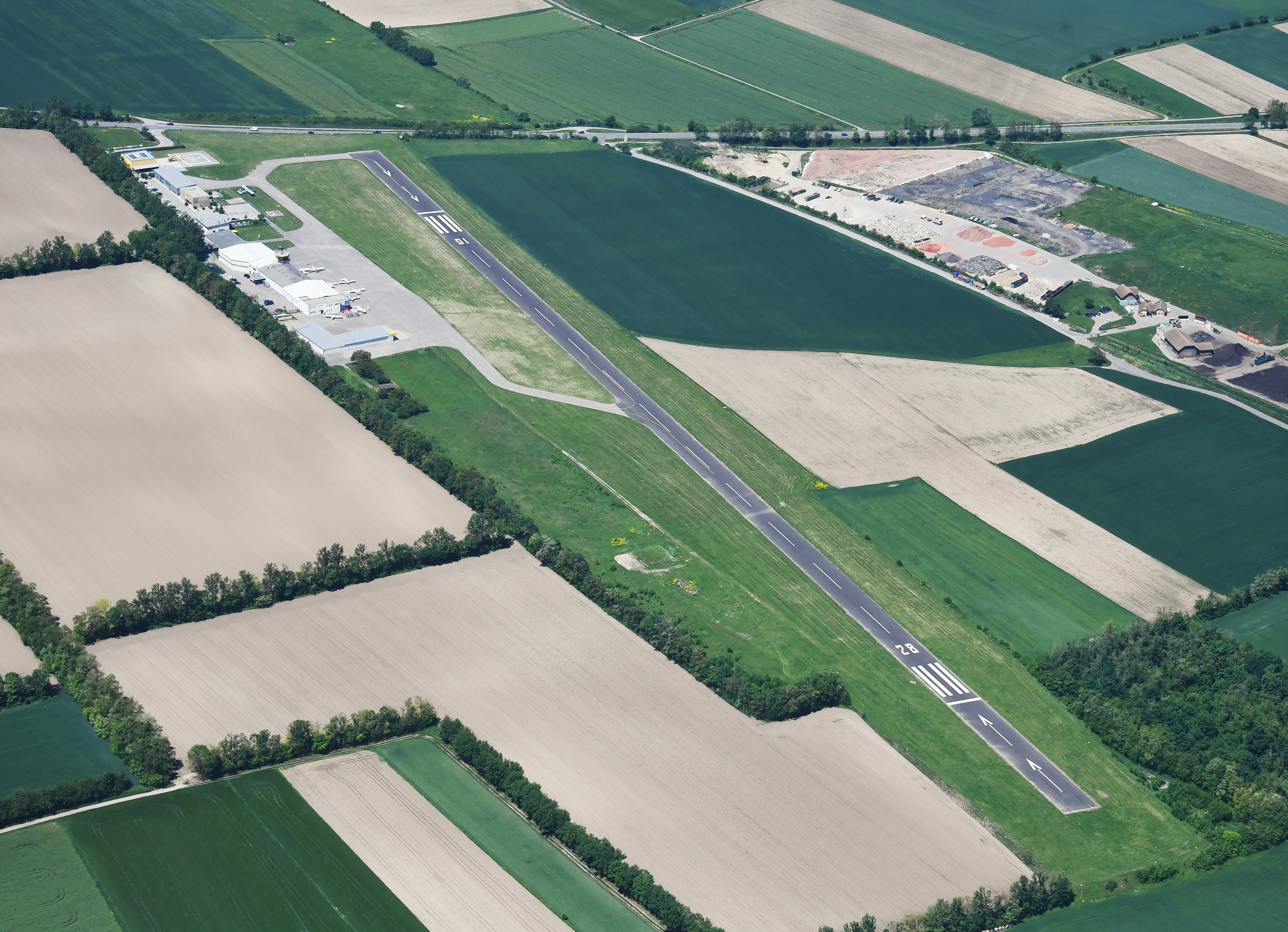
- IATA: none; ICAO: LOAG

Summary
- Airport type: Public
- Serves: Krems
- Location: Austria
- Elevation AMSL: 1,023 ft / 312 m
- Coordinates: 48°26′46.4″N 015°38′2.0″E

Map
- Location of Krems-Langenlois Airport in Austria

Runways
Direction	Length		Surface
Direction	ft	m	Surface
11/29	2,559	780	Asphalt
- Source: Landings.com

Krems-Langenlois Airport (German: Flugplatz Krems or Flugplatz Krems-Gneixendorf, ICAO: LOAG) is a public use airport located 5 kilometres (3 mi) north-northeast of Krems, Niederösterreich, Austria.

== See also ==
- List of airports in Austria
