= Linz-East Glider Field =

Linz-East Glider Field Flugplatz Linz-Ost
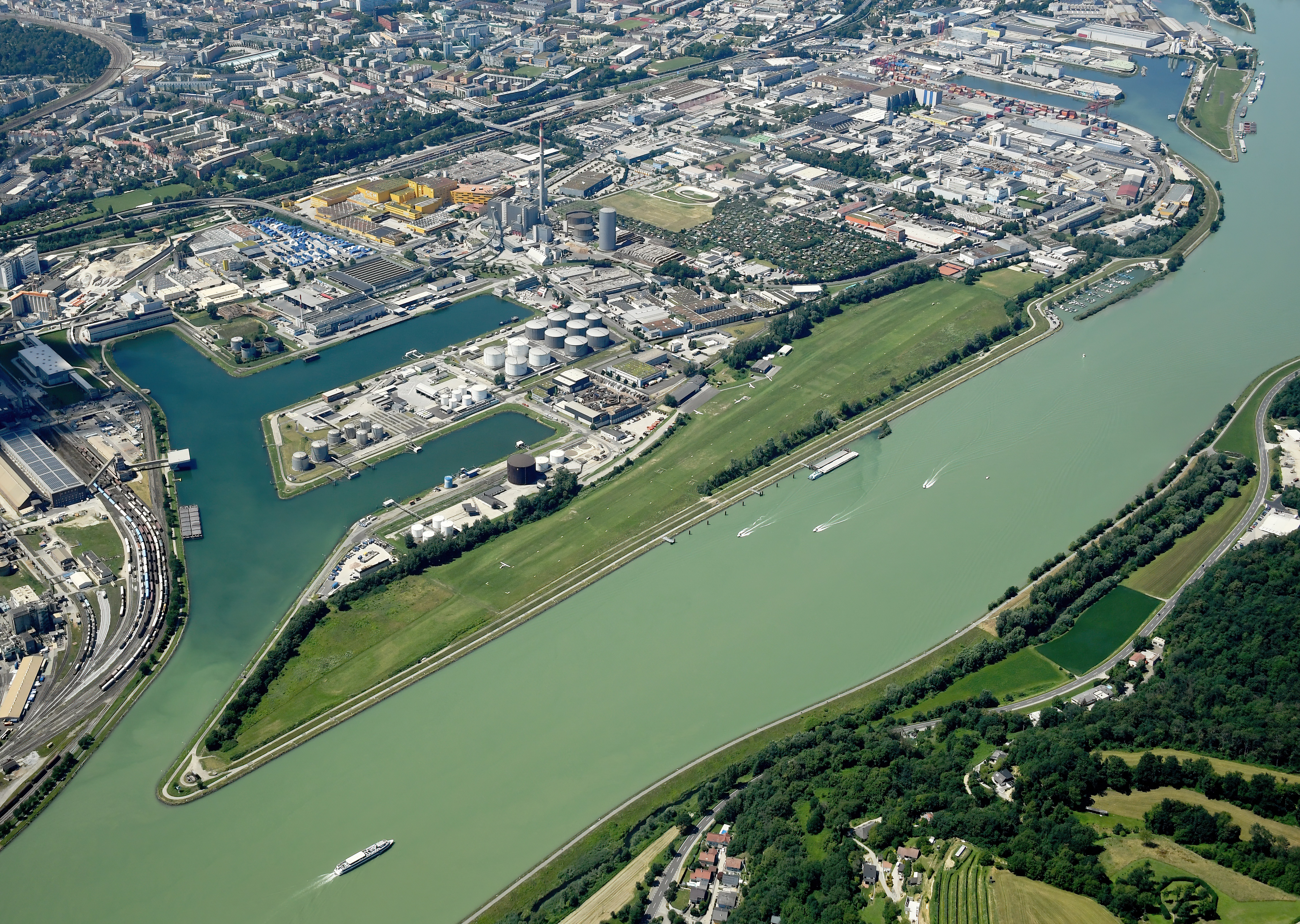
- IATA: none; ICAO: LOLO

Summary
- Airport type: Private
- Serves: Linz
- Location: Austria
- Elevation AMSL: 830 ft / 253 m
- Coordinates: 48°17′56.5″N 014°20′3.5″E

Map
- Location of Linz-East Glider Field in Austria

Runways
Direction	Length		Surface
Direction	ft	m	Surface
15/33	3,470	1,058	Grass

Linz-East Glider Field (German: Flugplatz Linz-Ost, ICAO: LOLO) is a recreational aerodrome located 4 kilometres (2 mi) east-southeast of Linz, Oberösterreich, Austria. As the name says, it mainly serves gliders.

== See also ==
- List of airports in Austria
