= Friesach/Hirt Airfield =

Friesach-Hirth Airfield Flugplatz Friesach-Hirth
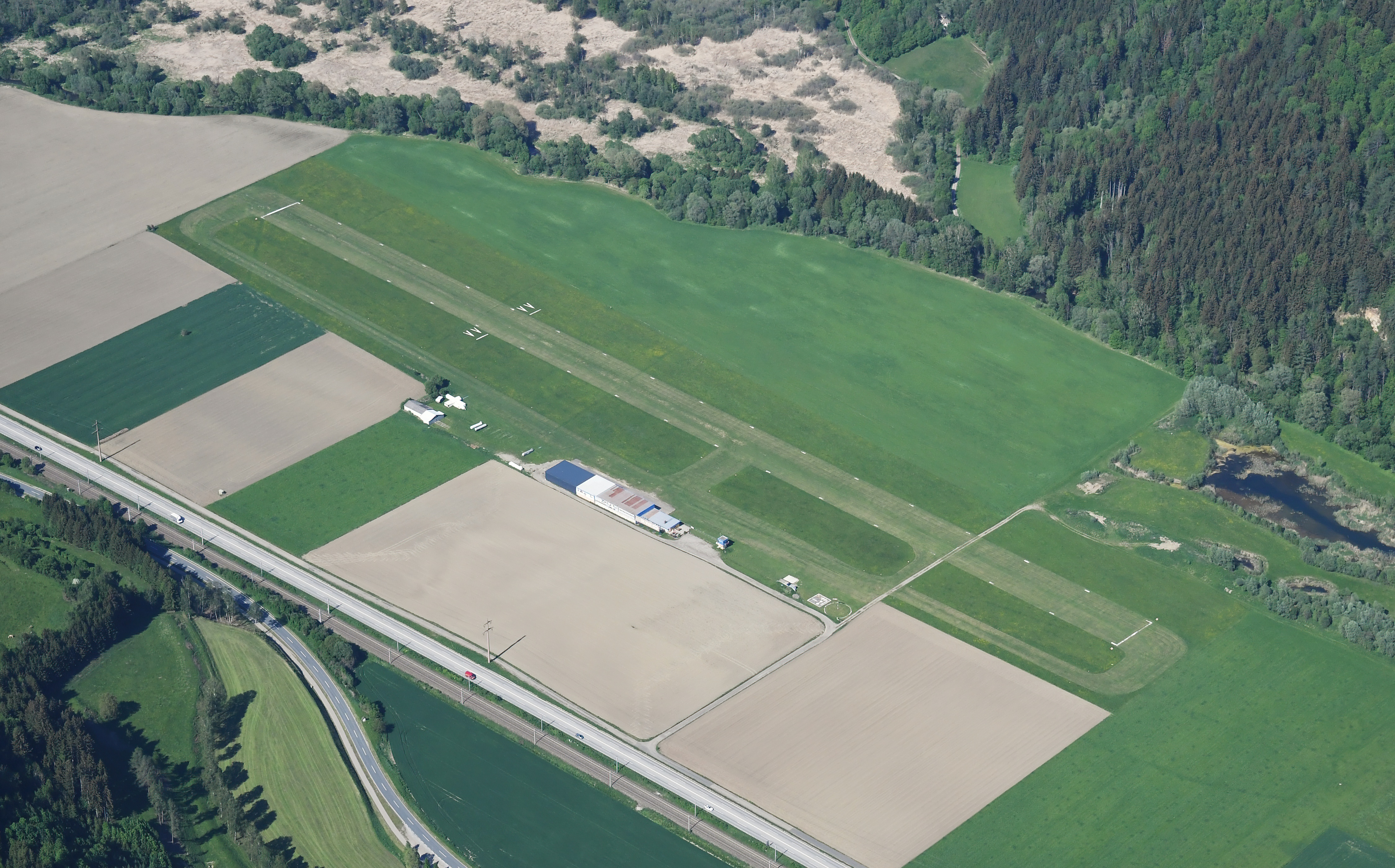
- IATA: none; ICAO: LOKH

Summary
- Airport type: Private
- Serves: Friesach
- Location: Austria
- Elevation AMSL: 2,024 ft / 617 m
- Coordinates: 46°55′43″N 014°26′00″E

Map
- Location of Friesach-Hirth Airfield in Austria

Runways
Direction	Length		Surface
Direction	ft	m	Surface
17/35	2,320	707	Grass
- Source: AIP Austria

Friesach/Hirt Airfield (German: Flugplatz Friesach/Hirt, ICAO: LOKH) is a private use aerodrome located 3 kilometres (1.9 mi) south-southeast of Friesach, Kärnten, Austria.

== See also ==
- List of airports in Austria
