= Seitenstetten =

- Municipality
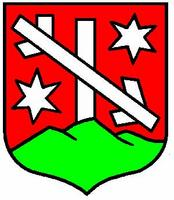
- Coat of arms

- Location within Austria
- Coordinates: 48°1′N 14°39′E
- Country: Austria
- State: Lower Austria
- District: Amstetten

Government
  - Mayor: Johann Spreizer

Area
  - Total: 30.46 km^{2} (11.76 sq mi)
- Elevation: 349 m (1,145 ft)

Population (2018-01-01)
  - Total: 3,394
  - Density: 111.4/km^{2} (288.6/sq mi)
- Time zone: UTC+1 (CET)
  - Summer (DST): UTC+2 (CEST)
- Postal code: 3353
- Area code: 07477
- Website: www.seitenstetten-gv.at

Seitenstetten is a town in the district of Amstetten in Lower Austria in Austria.

== Geography ==
Seitenstetten lies in the Mostviertel in Lower Austria. About 25.84 percent of the municipality is forested.

== History ==
One Udalschalk or Udiskalk, first mentioned in 1109, founded a monastery there in 1112 and gave all of his properties in Seitenstetten, Grünbach, Heft and Stille (in today's Upper Austria). In 1114, Benedictine monks from Göttweig Abbey were installed there. In 1116, Bishop Ulrich I. von Passau, related to the Udalschalk family, consecrated the abbey's church and donated the large Aschbach parish. In 1142, parish Wolfsbach was added. Those two major parishes were, by the time, split up into the fourteen parishes of which the abbey is in charge up to now.

Around 1180, Wichmann von Seeburg, Archbishop of Magdeburg, donated large woods near the Ybbs river.
