= Leopoldsdorf im Marchfeld =

- Municipality
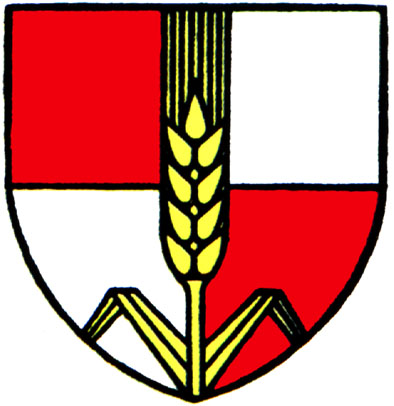
- Coat of arms

- Location within Austria
- Coordinates: 48°13′N 16°41′E
- Country: Austria
- State: Lower Austria
- District: Gänserndorf

Government
  - Mayor: Clemens Nagel

Area
  - Total: 28.95 km^{2} (11.18 sq mi)
- Elevation: 151 m (495 ft)

Population (2018-01-01)
  - Total: 2,848
  - Density: 98.38/km^{2} (254.8/sq mi)
- Time zone: UTC+1 (CET)
  - Summer (DST): UTC+2 (CEST)
- Postal code: 2285
- Area code: 02216
- Website: www.leopoldsdorf.net

Leopoldsdorf im Marchfeld is a town in the district of Gänserndorf in the Austrian state of Lower Austria.

== Geography ==
Leopoldsdorf im Marchfeld lies in the middle of the Marchfeld in the Weinviertel in Lower Austria. Only about 6.27 percent of the municipality is forested.
