= List of airports by ICAO code: LK-LZ =

List of airports by ICAO code: A - B - C - D - EB-EG - EH-EY - FA-FM - FN-FZ - G - H - ~~I~~ - J - KA-KH - KI-KP - KR-KZ - LA-LJ - LK-LZ - M - N - O - P - Q - R - SA-SC - SD-SH - SI - SJ - SK-SM - SN-SP - SQ - SS-SU - SV-SY - T - U - V - W - ~~X~~ - Y - Z

== LK – Czechia ==
Also see airport category and list.

ICAO	IATA	Airport name	Community	Coordinates	Notes
LKBA		Břeclav Airfield	Břeclav	48°47′27″N 016°53′33″E	
LKBC		Bechyně Airport	Bechyně	49°16′25″N 014°30′05″E	
LKBD		Brodek u Přerova Airport	Brodek u Přerova	49°29′02″N 017°19′37″E	
LKBE		Benešov Airfield	Benešov	49°44′27″N 014°38′41″E	
LKBG		Brno-Bohunice Main Heliport	Brno-Bohunice	49°10′35″N 016°34′20″E	
LKBH		Benešov Heliport	Benešov	49°47′19″N 014°40′48″E	
LKBI		Břeclav Hospital Heliport	Břeclav	48°45′08″N 016°52′40″E	
LKBL		Blansko Heliport	Blansko	49°21′45″N 016°39′15″E	
LKBN		Brno-Bohunice Reserve Heliport	Brno-Bohunice	49°10′32″N 016°34′10″E	
LKBO		Bohuňovice Airfield	Bohuňovice	49°40′14″N 017°17′42″E	
LKBP		Brno-Černá Pole Heliport	Černá Pole	49°12′12″N 016°36′59″E	
LKBR		Broumov Airport	Broumov	50°33′43″N 016°20′34″E	
LKBS		Boskovice Heliport	Boskovice	49°29′23″N 016°38′47″E	
LKBU		Bubovice Airfield	Bubovice	49°58′28″N 014°10′41″E	
LKBV		Svatá Anna Hospital Heliport	Brno	49°11′27″N 016°36′03″E	
LKCA		České Budějovice Base Heliport	České Budějovice	48°56′40″N 014°26′42″E	
LKCB		Cheb Airport	Cheb	50°03′58″N 012°24′41″E	
LKCC		České Budějovice Hospital Heliport	České Budějovice	48°57′43″N 014°27′46″E	
LKCD		Chrudim Hospital Heliport	Chrudim	49°56′28″N 015°48′30″E	
LKCE		Česká Lípa Airport	Česká Lípa	50°42′34″N 014°34′01″E	
LKCH		Chomutov Airport	Chomutov	50°28′08″N 013°28′05″E	
LKCL		Černovice Airport	Berno-Černovice	49°11′00″N 016°39′33″E	Closed
LKCM		Medlánky Airfield	Brno-Medlánky	49°14′14″N 016°33′17″E	
LKCO		Chotouň Heliport	Chrášťany	50°03′33″N 014°57′28″E	
LKCP		Chodová Planá Heliport	Chodová Planá	49°54′04″N 012°44′30″E	
LKCR		Chrudim Airport	Chrudim	49°56′11″N 015°46′50″E	
LKCS	JCL	České Budějovice Airport	České Budějovice	48°56′47″N 014°25′41″E	
LKCT		Chotěboř Airport	Chotěboř	49°41′09″N 015°40′34″E	
LKCU		Chomutov Hospital Heliport	Chomutov	50°27′13″N 013°24′43″E	
LKCV		Čáslav Air Base	Čáslav	49°56′24″N 015°22′48″E	
LKDC		Děčín Heliport	Děčín	50°46′52″N 014°13′40″E	
LKDK		Dvůr Králové nad Labem Airport	Dvůr Králové nad Labem	50°24′51″N 015°50′13″E	
LKDO		Domažlice Heliport	Domažlice	49°26′18″N 012°54′25″E	
LKER		Erpužice Airport	Erpužice	49°48′10″N 013°02′17″E	
LKFM		Frýdek-Místek Hospital Heliport	Frýdek-Místek	49°41′28″N 018°21′18″E	
LKFR		Frýdlant Airport	Frýdlant	49°35′22″N 018°22′45″E	
LKHA		Havířov Heliport	Havířov	49°47′01″N 018°26′23″E	
LKHB		Havlíčkův Brod Airport	Havlíčkův Brod	49°35′50″N 015°32′57″E	
LKHC		Hořice Airport	Hořice	50°21′24″N 015°34′38″E	
LKHD		Hodkovice nad Mohelkou Airport	Hodkovice nad Mohelkou	50°39′26″N 015°04′40″E	
LKHH		Hradec Králové Base Heliport	Hradec Králové	50°11′36″N 015°49′32″E	
LKHK		Hradec Králové Airport	Hradec Králové	50°15′20″N 015°50′43″E	
LKHL		Havlíčkův Brod Hospital Heliport	Havlíčkův Brod	49°36′37″N 015°34′14″E	
LKHN		Hranice Airport	Hranice	49°32′46″N 017°42′16″E	
LKHO	GTW	Holešov Airport	Holešov	49°19′01″N 017°33′29″E	
LKHR		Hradčany Air Base	Ralsko	50°37′14″N 014°44′17″E	Abandoned
LKHS		Hosín Airport	Hosín	49°02′24″N 014°29′42″E	
LKHV		Hořovice Airport	Hořovice	49°50′41″N 013°53′09″E	
LKJA		Jaroměř Airport	Jaroměř	50°19′53″N 015°57′14″E	
LKJC		Jičín Airport	Jičín	50°25′48″N 015°19′59″E	
LKJE		Jeseník Heliport	Jeseník	50°13′18″N 017°11′12″E	
LKJH		Jindřichův Hradec Airport	Jindřichův Hradec	49°09′03″N 014°58′18″E	
LKJI		Jihlava Airport	Jihlava	49°25′10″N 015°38′07″E	
LKJL		Jihlava Base Heliport	Jihlava	49°23′55″N 015°34′05″E	
LKJR		Jindřichův Hradec Hospital Heliport	Jindřichův Hradec	49°08′21″N 015°00′21″E	
LKKA		Křižanov Airport	Křižanov	49°22′06″N 016°06′58″E	
LKKB		Prague–Kbely Airport	Prague	50°07′16″N 014°32′35″E	Military
LKKC		Kříženec Airport	Kříženec	49°52′15″N 012°46′26″E	
LKKE		Karlov Heliport	Hartmanice	49°09′50″N 013°25′37″E	
LKKI		Krnov Hospital Heliport	Krnov	50°05′49″N 017°41′07″E	
LKKJ		Kyjov Hospital Heliport	Kyjov	49°00′30″N 017°06′38″E	
LKKL		Kladno Airport	Kladno	50°06′46″N 014°05′23″E	
LKKM		Kroměříž Airport	Kroměříž	49°17′08″N 017°24′57″E	
LKKN		Karlovy Vary Hospital Heliport	Karlovy Vary	50°13′58″N 012°52′35″E	
LKKO		Kolín Airport	Kolín	50°00′07″N 015°10′24″E	
LKKR		Krnov Airport	Krnov	50°04′28″N 017°41′43″E	
LKKT		Klatovy Airfield	Klatovy	49°25′06″N 013°19′19″E	
LKKU	UHE	Kunovice Airport	Kunovice	49°01′46″N 017°26′23″E	
LKKV	KLV	Karlovy Vary Airport	Karlovy Vary	50°12′11″N 012°54′54″E	
LKKY		Kyjov Airport	Kyjov	48°58′56″N 017°07′43″E	
LKKZ		Kroměříž Hospital Heliport	Kroměříž	49°17′28″N 017°22′47″E	
LKLA		Liberec ACL Heliport	Liberec	50°44′02″N 015°02′15″E	
LKLB		Liberec Airport	Liberec	50°46′01″N 015°01′23″E	
LKLC		Liberec Hospital Heliport	Liberec	50°46′12″N 015°03′50″E	
LKLH		Liberec Base Heliport	Liberec	50°46′08″N 015°01′27″E	
LKLK		Kbely Heliport	Prague 19 (Kbely)	50°08′01″N 014°32′12″E	
LKLN		Plzeň-Líně Airfield	Plzeň	49°40′31″N 013°16′28″E	
LKLO		Litoměřice Heliport	Litoměřice	50°32′30″N 014°08′46″E	
LKLT		Praha Letňany Airfield	Letňany	50°07′53″N 014°31′32″E	
LKMB		Mladá Boleslav Airport	Mladá Boleslav	50°24′02″N 014°53′52″E	
LKME		Mělník Heliport	Mělník	50°21′07″N 014°29′13″E	
LKMH		Mnichovo Hradiště Airport	Mnichovo Hradiště	50°32′24″N 015°00′24″E	
LKMI		Mikulovice Airport	Mikulovice	50°18′06″N 017°17′51″E	
LKMK		Moravská Třebová Airport	Moravská Třebová	49°47′54″N 016°41′16″E	
LKML		Mladá Boleslav Hospital Heliport	Mladá Boleslav	50°25′08″N 014°54′26″E	
LKMO		Most Airport	Most	50°31′30″N 013°40′59″E	
LKMR		Mariánské Lázně Airport	Mariánské Lázně	49°55′24″N 012°43′36″E	Out of use
LKMS		Most Hospital Heliport	Most	50°30′12″N 013°37′50″E	
LKMT	OSR	Leoš Janáček Airport Ostrava (formerly Ostrava-Mošnov International Airport)	Ostrava	49°41′46″N 018°06′39″E	
LKNA		Náměšť Air Base	Náměšť nad Oslavou	49°09′58″N 016°07′28″E	
LKNC		Náchod Heliport	Náchod	50°24′37″N 016°10′00″E	
LKNE		Nedanice Heliport	Nedanice	49°27′20″N 013°23′06″E	
LKNK		Nová Amerika Heliport	Kuks	50°22′50″N 015°51′49″E	
LKNM		Nové Město Airport	Nové Město nad Metují	50°21′51″N 016°06′49″E	
LKNO		Nové Město Heliport	Nové Město na Moravě	49°33′41″N 016°03′47″E	
LKNR		Neratovice Heliport	Neratovice	50°15′09″N 014°31′16″E	
LKOC		Olomouc Hospital Heliport	Olomouc	49°35′03″N 017°14′12″E	
LKOL	OLO	Olomouc Airport	Olomouc	49°35′14″N 017°12′36″E	
LKOP		Ostrava Hospital Heliport	Ostrava	49°49′47″N 018°09′37″E	
LKOT		Olomouc Base Heliport	Olomouc	49°35′01″N 017°13′13″E	
LKOV		Opava Heliport	Opava	49°56′10″N 017°52′33″E	
LKOZ		Ostrava Base Heliport	Ostrava	49°48′12″N 018°13′50″E	
LKPA		Polička Airport	Polička	49°44′22″N 016°15′32″E	
LKPB		Bulovka Hospital Heliport	Bulovka	50°06′58″N 014°27′45″E	
LKPC		Panenský Týnec Airport	Panenský Týnec	50°18′23″N 013°56′06″E	
LKPD	PED	Pardubice Airport	Pardubice	50°00′48″N 015°44′19″E	
LKPE		Pelhřimov Heliport	Pelhřimov	49°26′07″N 015°13′52″E	
LKPF		Písek Hospital Heliport	Písek	49°18′02″N 014°09′32″E	
LKPG		Prachatice Heliport	Prachatice	49°00′25″N 014°00′34″E	
LKPH		Motol Heliport	Motol	50°04′26″N 014°20′33″E	
LKPI		Přibyslav Airport	Přibyslav	49°34′51″N 015°45′46″E	
LKPJ		Prostějov Airport	Prostějov	49°26′52″N 017°08′02″E	
LKPK		Krč Heliport	Krč	50°01′55″N 014°27′25″E	
LKPL		Letkov Airport	Letkov	49°43′23″N 013°27′08″E	
LKPM		Příbram Airport	Příbram	49°43′07″N 014°05′49″E	
LKPN		Podhořany Airport	Podhořany	49°56′21″N 015°32′59″E	
LKPO	PRV	Přerov Airport	Přerov	49°25′33″N 017°24′17″E	
LKPP		Přední Kopanina Heliport	Přední Kopanina	50°07′10″N 014°18′11″E	
LKPR	PRG	Václav Havel Airport Prague	Prague	50°06′06″N 014°15′48″E	
LKPS		Plasy Airport	Plasy	49°55′13″N 013°22′37″E	
LKPU		Pardubice Hospital Heliport	Pardubice	50°01′44″N 015°47′21″E	
LKPV		Pacov-Kámen Airport	Kámen	49°25′00″N 014°59′55″E	Closed
LKPY		Vinohrady Heliport	Vinohrady	50°04′29″N 014°28′55″E	
LKPZ		Plzeň Main Heliport	Plzeň	49°45′43″N 013°22′45″E	
LKRA		Raná u Loun Airport	Raná	50°24′14″N 013°45′07″E	
LKRK		Rakovník Airfield	Rakovník	50°05′39″N 013°41′20″E	
LKRO		Roudnice Airport	Roudnice	50°24′38″N 014°13′34″E	
LKRV		Rakovník Hospital Heliport	Rakovník	50°06′28″N 013°43′07″E	
LKRY		Rokycany Airport	Rokycany	49°45′07″N 013°35′23″E	
LKRZ		Rozvadov Heliport	Rozvadov	49°40′07″N 012°33′36″E	
LKSA		Staňkov Airport	Staňkov	49°34′00″N 013°02′55″E	
LKSB		Stichovice Airport	Mostkovice	49°29′10″N 017°03′20″E	
LKSK		Skuteč Airport	Skuteč	49°49′40″N 016°00′21″E	
LKSL		Solnice ACL Heliport	Solnice	50°11′43″N 016°14′53″E	
LKSN		Slaný Airport	Slaný	50°13′00″N 014°05′19″E	
LKSO		Soběslav Airport	Soběslav	49°14′48″N 014°42′49″E	
LKSP		Šumperk Hospital Heliport	Šumperk	49°57′28″N 016°57′47″E	
LKSR		Strunkovice Airport	Strunkovice nad Volyňkou	49°04′57″N 014°04′33″E	
LKST		Strakonice Airport	Strakonice	49°15′06″N 013°53′34″E	
LKSU		Šumperk Airport	Šumperk	49°57′38″N 017°01′04″E	
LKSV		Svitavy Heliport	Svitavy	49°45′50″N 016°27′45″E	
LKSZ		Sazená Airport	Sazená	50°19′29″N 014°15′32″E	
LKTA		Tábor Airport	Tábor	49°23′28″N 014°42′30″E	
LKTB	BRQ	Brno-Tuřany Airport	Brno	49°09′05″N 016°41′40″E	
LKTC		Točná Airport	Točná	49°59′06″N 014°25′31″E	
LKTD		Tachov Airport	Tachov	49°47′52″N 012°42′25″E	
LKTH		Těchonín Airfield	Těchonín	50°03′36″N 016°36′44″E	
LKTO		Toužim Airport	Toužim	50°05′11″N 012°57′10″E	
LKTR		Tábor Hospital Heliport	Tábor	49°24′57″N 014°39′08″E	
LKTU		Trutnov Heliport	Trutnov	50°35′10″N 015°52′43″E	
LKTV		Všechov Airport	Svrabov	49°26′15″N 014°37′18″E	Closed
LKUB		Ústí nad Labem Base Heliport	Ústí nad Labem	50°40′39″N 014°01′26″E	
LKUH		Uherské Hradiště Mařatice Heliport	Uherské Hradiště	49°04′48″N 017°29′07″E	
LKUL		Ústí nad Labem Airport	Ústí nad Labem	50°41′59″N 013°58′11″E	
LKUN		Uherské Hradiště Hospital Heliport	Uherské Hradiště	49°03′47″N 017°26′58″E	
LKUO		Ústí nad Orlicí Airport	Ústí nad Orlicí	49°58′43″N 016°25′35″E	
LKUS		Ústí nad Labem Hospital Heliport	Ústí nad Labem	50°40′47″N 014°01′15″E	
LKVL		Vlašim Airport	Vlašim	49°43′44″N 014°52′44″E	
LKVM		Vysoké Mýto Airport	Vysoké Mýto	49°55′36″N 016°11′09″E	
LKVN		Vyškov Hospital Heliport	Vyškov	49°16′41″N 016°58′53″E	
LKVO		Vodochody Airport	Vodochody	50°12′59″N 014°23′42″E	
LKVP		Velké Poříčí Airport	Velké Poříčí	50°28′04″N 016°12′20″E	
LKVR		Vrchlabí Airport	Vrchlabí	50°37′27″N 015°38′47″E	
LKVY		Vyškov Airport	Vyškov	49°18′01″N 017°01′31″E	
LKZA	ZBE	Zábřeh Airport	Dolní Benešov	49°55′42″N 018°04′42″E	
LKZB		Zbraslavice Airport	Zbraslavice	49°48′50″N 015°12′06″E	
LKZC		Žatec-Staňkovice Airport	Bitozeves	50°22′18″N 013°35′21″E	Closed
LKZD		Žatec-Macerka Airport	Žatec	50°19′03″N 013°30′46″E	
LKZI		Zlín Hospital Heliport	Zlín	49°13′34″N 017°42′19″E	
LKZL		Zlín Otrokovice Airfield	Otrokovice	49°11′54″N 017°31′04″E	
LKZM		Žamberk Airport	Žamberk	50°05′02″N 016°26′38″E	
LKZN		Znojmo Airport	Znojmo	48°49′04″N 016°03′57″E	
LKZO		Znojmo Hospital Heliport	Znojmo	48°52′06″N 016°03′05″E	

== LL – Israel ==
Also see airport category and list.

ICAO	IATA	Airport name	Community	Coordinates	Notes
LLAR		Arad Airport	Arad	31°13′47″N 035°11′22″E	
LLAZ	GHK	Gaza Airstrip	Khan Yunis, Gaza Strip	31°22′03″N 034°17′41″E	Formerly Gush Katif Airport
LLBO		HaBonim Airport	HaBonim	32°38′59″N 034°55′59″E	
LLBG	TLV	Ben Gurion International Airport	Tel Aviv	32°00′34″N 034°52′58″E	
LLBS	BEV	Be'er Sheva Airport (Teyman Airport)	Beersheba (Be'er Sheva)	31°17′13″N 034°43′22″E	
LLEK		Tel Nof Israeli Air Force Base	Tel Nof (Tel Nov)	31°50′22″N 034°49′19″E	
LLER	ETM	Ramon Airport	Eilat	29°43′25″N 035°00′41″E	
LLES		Ein Shemer Airfield	Ein Shemer (Eyn-Shemer)	32°26′27″N 035°00′29″E	
LLET	ETH	Eilat Airport (J. Hozman Airport)	Eilat	29°33′30″N 034°57′32″E	
LLEV		Ein Vered Airport	Ein Vered	32°15′54″N 034°57′06″E	
LLEY	EIY	Ein Yahav Airfield	Ein Yahav (Eyn-Yahav)	30°37′17″N 035°12′11″E	
LLFK		Fiq Airfield	Fiq, Golan Heights	32°47′07″N 035°43′02″E	
LLHA	HFA	Haifa International Airport (U. Michaeli Airport)	Haifa	32°48′34″N 035°02′35″E	
LLHB		Hatzerim Airbase (Hatzerim)	Beersheba (Be'er Sheva)	31°14′00″N 034°39′45″E	
LLHS		Hatzor Airbase	Hatzor	31°45′45″N 034°43′38″E	
LLHZ		Herzliya Airport	Herzliya (Herzlia)	32°10′49″N 034°50′02″E	
LLIB	RPN	Rosh Pina Airport (Ben Ya'aqov Airport)	Rosh-Pina	32°58′52″N 035°34′19″E	
LLJR	JRS	Jerusalem International Airport	Jerusalem	31°51′53″N 035°13′09″E	Closed after the Second Intifada
LLKS	KSW	Kiryat Shmona Airport	Kiryat Shmona (Qiryat Shemona)	33°13′00″N 035°35′48″E	
LLMG		Megiddo Airport (military)	Megiddo (Meggido)	32°35′50″N 035°13′44″E	
LLMR	MIP	Mitzpe Ramon Airfield	Mitzpe Ramon	30°39′08″N 034°48′24″E	
LLMZ	MTZ	Bar Yehuda Airfield	Masada	31°19′41″N 035°23′19″E	
LLNV		Nevatim Israeli Air Force Base	Nevatim	31°12′30″N 035°00′44″E	
LLOV	VDA	Ovda Airport	Negev	29°56′19″N 034°56′13″E	Formerly civil, now military only
LLPL		Palmachim Airbase	Yavne	31°53′52″N 034°41′26″E	
LLRD		Ramat David Israeli Air Force Base	Megiddo	32°39′55″N 035°10′46″E	
LLRM		Ramon Airbase	Mitzpe Ramon	30°46′29″N 034°40′04″E	
LLRS		Rishon LeZion Airport	Rishon LeZion	31°57′58″N 034°45′12″E	
LLSD	SDV	Sde Dov Airport (Dov Hoz Airport)	Tel Aviv	32°06′39″N 034°46′46″E	Closed July 1, 2019
LLTN		Tnuvot Airport	Tnuvot	32°18′31″N 034°58′42″E	
LLYO	YOT	Yotvata Airfield	Yotvata	29°54′04″N 035°04′03″E	

== LM – Malta ==
Also see airport category and list.

ICAO	IATA	Airport name	Community	Coordinates
LMMG	GZM	Xewkija Heliport (Gozo Heliport)	Gozo	36°01′38″N 014°16′19″E
LMML	MLA	Malta International Airport (Luqa Airport)	Luqa	35°51′27″N 014°28′39″E

== LN – Monaco ==
Also see airport category and list.

ICAO	IATA	Airport name	Community	Coordinates
LNMC	MCM	Monaco Heliport	Monte Carlo	43°43′35″N 007°25′14″E

== LO – Austria ==
Also see airport category and list.

ICAO	IATA	Airport name	Community	Coordinates	Notes
LOAA		Ottenschlag Airport	Ottenschlag	48°25′07″N 015°12′55″E	
LOAB		Dobersberg Airport	Dobersberg	48°55′20″N 015°17′49″E	
LOAD		Völtendorf Airfield	St. Pölten, Lower Austria	48°09′37″N 015°35′16″E	
LOAG		Krems-Gneixendorf Airfield	Gneixendorf, Lower Austria	48°26′46″N 015°38′02″E	
LOAL		Leopoldsdorf im Marchfeld Airport	Leopoldsdorf im Marchfeld	48°13′35″N 016°40′22″E	
LOAN		Wiener Neustadt East Airport	Wiener Neustadt	47°50′36″N 016°15′36″E	
LOAR		Altlichtenwarth Airport	Altlichtenwarth	48°39′58″N 016°49′30″E	
LOAS		Spitzerberg Airport	Hundsheim	48°05′56″N 016°56′00″E	
LOAT		Wiener Neustadt Flight Operations Base	Wiener Neustadt	47°50′07″N 016°12′32″E	
LOAU		Stockerau Airfield	Stockerau, Lower Austria	48°24′33″N 016°11′28″E	
LOAV		Vöslau Airfield	Bad Vöslau, Lower Austria	47°57′53″N 016°15′39″E	
LOBI		Mödling Krankenhaus Heliport	Landesklinikum Mödling, Mödling, Lower Austria	48°05′22″N 016°17′54″E	
LOBU		Vienna Meidling Trauma Center Heliport	Meidling, Vienna	48°10′22″N 016°20′41″E	
LODK		Kalwang Hospital Heliport	Kalwang	47°25′32″N 014°45′36″E	
LODO		Oberwart Heliport	Oberwart	47°18′19″N 016°11′01″E	Operated by the Austrian Automobile, Motorcycle and Touring Club
LOGF		Fürstenfeld Airport	Fürstenfeld	47°03′43″N 016°05′02″E	
LOGG		Punitz Airfield	Güssing, Burgenland	47°08′49″N 016°19′00″E	
LOGH		Graz Regional Hospital Heliport	Geidorf, Graz	47°04′48″N 015°27′50″E	
LOGI		Trieben Airport	Trieben	47°29′36″N 014°29′44″E	
LOGK		Kapfenberg Airport	Kapfenberg	47°27′27″N 015°19′54″E	
LOGL		Lanzen-Turnau Airport	Turnau	47°33′23″N 015°19′18″E	
LOGM		Mariazell Airport	Mariazell	47°47′23″N 015°18′01″E	
LOGO		Niederöblarn Airport	Niederöblarn	47°28′44″N 014°00′26″E	
LOGP		Pinkafeld Airport	Pinkafeld	47°23′12″N 016°06′46″E	
LOGT		Leoben/Timmersdorf Airfield	Timmersdorf, Styria	47°22′47″N 014°57′50″E	
LOGW		Weiz-Unterfladnitz Airport	Weiz	47°10′12″N 015°39′52″E	
LOGZ		Graz Children's Regional Hospital Heliport	Geidorf, Graz	47°05′04″N 015°28′08″E	
LOIH		Hohenems-Dornbirn Airport	Hohenems, Vorarlberg	47°23′04″N 009°41′59″E	
LOIJ		Sankt Johann Airfield	Sankt Johann in Tirol	47°31′13″N 012°26′58″E	
LOIK		Kufstein-Langkampfen Airport	Kufstein	47°33′53″N 012°07′38″E	
LOIR		Reutte-Höfen Airfield	Reutte	47°28′16″N 010°41′30″E	
LOIT		Sankt Johann in Tirol Heliport	Sankt Johann in Tirol	47°31′15″N 012°25′47″E	
LOIY		Sanatorium Dr. Schenk Heliport	Schruns	47°04′26″N 009°54′48″E	
LOJD		Dornbirn Hospital Heliport	Dornbirn	47°24′23″N 009°44′24″E	
LOKF		Feldkirchen Airfield	Ossiacher See, Carinthia	46°42′30″N 014°04′34″E	
LOKG		Ferlach-Glainach Airport	Ferlach	46°31′58″N 014°19′51″E	
LOKH		Friesach/Hirt Airfield	Friesach	46°55′39″N 014°25′55″E	
LOKL		Lienz-Nikolsdorf Airport	Nikolsdorf, Tyrol	46°47′53″N 012°52′41″E	
LOKM		Mayerhofen Airfield	Mayerhofen	46°58′30″N 014°22′16″E	
LOKN		Nötsch im Gailtal Airport	Nötsch im Gailtal	46°34′50″N 013°37′48″E	
LOKR		Sankt Donat-Mairist Airport	St. Veit an der Glan	46°44′36″N 014°24′48″E	
LOKW		Wolfsberg Airfield	Wolfsberg	46°49′04″N 014°49′30″E	
LOLC		Scharnstein Airport	Scharnstein	47°53′52″N 013°56′18″E	
LOLE		Eferding Airport	Eferding	48°20′20″N 013°59′07″E	
LOLF		Freistadt Airport	Freistadt	48°30′50″N 014°24′23″E	
LOLG		St. Georgen Airfield	Leutzmannsdorf, Lower Austria	48°06′11″N 014°57′03″E	
LOLH		Hofkirchen Airfield	Hofkirchen	48°08′21″N 014°20′09″E	
LOLI		Salzkammergut Bad Ischl Hospital Heliport	Bad Ischl	47°42′21″N 013°37′24″E	
LOLK		Ried-Kirchheim Airport	Ried im Innkreis	48°12′44″N 013°20′45″E	
LOLM		Micheldorf Airport	Micheldorf in Oberösterreich	47°52′18″N 014°07′31″E	
LOLO		Linz Ost Airfield (Linz East Airfield)	Linz, Upper Austria	48°17′57″N 014°20′04″E	
LOLR		Ried im Innkreis Hospital Heliport	Ried im Innkreis	48°12′36″N 013°29′35″E	
LOLS		Schärding-Suben Airport	Schärding	48°24′11″N 013°26′54″E	
LOLT		Seitenstetten Airport	Seitenstetten	48°03′00″N 014°39′45″E	
LOLU		Gmunden Laakirchen Airfield	Gmunden, Upper Austria	47°57′06″N 013°52′02″E	
LOLV		Salzkammergut Vöcklabruck Hospital Heliport	Vöcklabruck	48°00′10″N 013°38′21″E	
LOLW		Wels Airport	Wels, Upper Austria	48°11′02″N 014°02′24″E	
LOPB		Braunau am Inn Hospital Heliport	Braunau am Inn	48°15′22″N 013°02′00″E	
LOPF		Freistadt Regional Hospital Heliport	Freistadt	48°29′29″N 014°29′51″E	
LOPG		Salzkammergut Gmunden Hospital Heliport	Gmunden	47°54′56″N 013°46′45″E	
LOPI		Grieskirchen Hospital Heliport	Grieskirchen	48°14′17″N 013°49′11″E	
LOPK		Kirchdorf Regional Hospital Heliport	Kirchdorf an der Krems	47°54′31″N 014°07′29″E	
LOPR		Rohrbach Regional Hospital Heliport	Rohrbach-Berg	48°34′18″N 013°58′52″E	
LOPT		Steyr Regional Hospital Heliport	Steyr	48°02′44″N 014°23′33″E	
LOSM		Mauterndorf Airport	Mauterndorf	47°07′55″N 013°41′45″E	
LOWG	GRZ	Graz Airport	Graz, Styria	46°59′27″N 015°26′22″E	Military flights use ICAO code LOXG
LOWI	INN	Innsbruck Airport	Innsbruck, Tyrol	47°15′36″N 011°20′38″E	
LOWK	KLU	Klagenfurt Airport (Kärnten Airport)	Klagenfurt, Carinthia	46°38′33″N 014°20′15″E	
LOWL	LNZ	Linz Airport (Blue Danube Airport Linz)	Linz, Upper Austria	48°13′59″N 014°11′15″E	Military flights use ICAO code LOXL
LOWS	SZG	Salzburg Airport (Salzburg Airport W.A. Mozart)	Salzburg, Salzburg	47°47′35″N 013°00′15″E	
LOWW	VIE	Vienna International Airport (Wien-Schwechat Airport)	Schwechat, Lower Austria	48°06′37″N 016°34′11″E	Military flights use ICAO code LOXW
LOWZ	QOZ	Zell am See Airport	Zell am See	47°17′29″N 012°47′24″E	
LOXA		Aigen-Fiala Fernbrugg Air Base	Aigen im Ennstal, Styria	47°32′09″N 014°08′29″E	
LOXN		Wiener Neustadt West Airport	Wiener Neustadt, Lower Austria	47°50′27″N 016°13′18″E	
LOXS		Schwaz Heliport	Schwaz	47°20′06″N 011°41′51″E	Closed
LOXT		Figl Air Base	Tulln, Lower Austria	48°19′10″N 016°06′51″E	
LOXZ		Zeltweg Air Base	Zeltweg, Styria	47°12′09″N 014°44′39″E	

== LP – Portugal ==
Also see airport category and list.

ICAO	IATA	Airport name	Community	Coordinates	Notes
LPAB		Abrantes Hospital Heliport	Abrantes	39°27′22″N 008°11′59″W	
LPAF		Alfragide Heliport	Alfragide	38°44′04″N 009°13′28″W	
LPAG		Albergaria-a-Velha Heliport	Albergaria-a-Velha	40°42′26″N 008°29′29″W	
LPAR		Alverca Air Base	Alverca do Ribatejo, Vila Franca de Xira	38°53′00″N 009°01′48″W	
LPAS		Amadora Hospital Heliport	Amadora	38°44′32″N 009°14′45″W	
LPAV		São Jacinto Airfield	Aveiro	40°39′15″N 008°44′37″W	
LPAZ	SMA	Santa Maria Airport	Vila do Porto / Santa Maria Island	36°58′26″N 025°10′16″W	
LPBA		Barlavento Algarvio Hospital Heliport	Portimão	37°09′24″N 008°32′27″W	
LPBG	BGC	Bragança Airport	Bragança	41°51′24″N 006°42′27″W	
LPBH		Braga Hospital Heliport	Braga	41°34′07″N 008°24′00″W	
LPBJ	BYJ	Beja Air Base/Beja Airport	Beja	38°04′44″N 007°55′57″W	
LPBR	BGZ	Braga Airport	Palmeira, Braga	41°35′13″N 008°26′42″W	
LPCB		Castelo Branco Airfield	Castelo Branco	39°50′54″N 007°26′30″W	
LPCC		Funchal Hospital Heliport	Funchal	32°38′52″N 016°55′25″W	
LPCD		Santa Comba Dão Heliport	Santa Comba Dão	40°23′54″N 008°08′03″W	
LPCH	CHV	Chaves Airport	Chaves	41°43′20″N 007°27′50″W	
LPCI		Coimbra University Hospital Heliport	Coimbra	40°13′12″N 008°24′47″W	
LPCL		Covilhã Heliport	Covilhã	40°16′03″N 007°29′29″W	
LPCO	CBP	Coimbra Airfield (Bissaya Barreto Aerodrome)	Coimbra	40°09′22″N 008°28′12″W	
LPCR	CVU	Corvo Airport	Vila do Corvo / Corvo Island	39°40′15″N 031°06′46″W	
LPCS	CAT	Lisbon Cascais-Tejo Regional Airport (Cascais Municipal Aerodrome)	São Domingos de Rana, Cascais, Greater Lisbon	38°43′32″N 009°21′19″W	
LPCV		Coimbra Covões Hospital Heliport	Coimbra	40°11′41″N 008°27′37″W	Closed
LPDA		Massarelos Heliport	Lordelo do Ouro e Massarelos	41°08′48″N 008°37′58″W	
LPER		Évora Heliport	Évora	38°34′05″N 007°54′09″W	
LPEV		Évora Airport	Évora / Alentejo Central	38°31′47″N 007°53′31″W	
LPFA		Ferreira do Alentejo Airport	Ferreira do Alentejo	38°02′23″N 008°06′16″W	
LPFC		Figueira dos Cavaleiros Airport	Figueira dos Cavaleiros	38°04′35″N 008°14′07″W	
LPFE		Fafe Heliport	Fafe	41°27′23″N 008°08′17″W	
LPFL	FLW	Flores Airport	Santa Cruz das Flores / Flores Island	39°27′29″N 031°07′56″W	
LPFO		Faro District Hospital Heliport	Faro	37°01′31″N 007°55′45″W	
LPFR	FAO	Faro Airport	Faro / Algarve	37°00′52″N 007°57′57″W	Also known as Algarve Airport
LPFX		Carnaxide Hospital de Santa Cruz Heliport	Carnaxide e Queijas	38°43′34″N 009°14′03″W	
LPGA		Guarda Hospital Heliport	Guarda	40°31′47″N 007°16′40″W	
LPGO		Almada Hospital Heliport	Almada	38°40′30″N 009°10′38″W	
LPGR	GRW	Graciosa Airport	Santa Cruz da Graciosa / Graciosa Island	39°05′32″N 028°01′46″W	
LPHB		Herdade da Brava Heliport	Mértola	37°41′43″N 007°37′14″W	
LPHC		Cascais Hospital Heliport	Cascais	38°43′44″N 009°25′08″W	
LPHR	HOR	Horta Airport	Horta / Faial Island	38°31′12″N 028°42′59″W	
LPIN		Espinho Airfield	Paramos / Silvalde / Espinho	40°58′25″N 008°38′40″W	
LPJB		Algés Heliport	Algés	38°41′45″N 009°14′09″W	
LPJF		Leiria Airport	Leiria	39°46′48″N 008°49′13″W	
LPLA	TER	Lajes Air Base (Lajes Field)	Lajes / Terceira Island	38°45′43″N 027°05′27″W	
LPLE		Leiria Hospital Heliport	Leiria	39°44′40″N 008°47′35″W	
LPLG		Brigadeiro Franco Airport	Lagos	37°06′51″N 008°40′13″W	
LPLO		Loulé Heliport	Loulé	37°07′53″N 008°01′58″W	
LPLR		Loures Beatriz Ângelo Hospital Heliport	Loures	38°49′19″N 009°10′27″W	
LPLZ		Lousã Airport	Lousã	40°08′35″N 008°14′28″W	
LPMA	FNC	Madeira Airport (Cristiano Ronaldo International Airport/Funchal Airport)	Funchal / Madeira Island	32°41′39″N 016°46′41″W	
LPMB		Morgado de Apra Heliport	Loulé	37°08′59″N 007°57′14″W	
LPMC		Macedo de Cavaleiros Heliport	Macedo de Cavaleiros	41°31′31″N 006°57′59″W	
LPMD		Mirandela Heliport	Mirandela	41°29′05″N 007°11′26″W	
LPMF		Monfortinho Airport	Monfortinho, Idanha-a-Nova	39°58′30″N 006°54′20″W	
LPMI		Mirandela Airport	Mirandela	41°28′10″N 007°13′35″W	
LPMN		Amendoeira Airport	Montemor-o-Novo	38°42′34″N 008°16′30″W	
LPMO		Montargil Airport	Montargil, Ponte de Sor	38°59′35″N 008°08′30″W	
LPMP		Mafra Heliport	Mafra	38°56′35″N 009°21′14″W	
LPMR		Monte Real Air Base	Monte Real, Leiria	39°49′42″N 008°53′15″W	
LPMT		Montijo Air Base	Montijo	38°42′14″N 009°02′09″W	
LPMU		Mogadouro Aerodrome	Mogadouro	41°23′47″N 006°41′01″W	
LPMZ		Porto Moniz Heliport	Porto Moniz	32°52′00″N 017°09′55″W	
LPNV		Rainha Santa Isabel Hospital Heliport	Torres Novas	39°28′10″N 008°32′14″W	
LPOT		Military and Technical Training Center of the Air Force	Ota, Alenquer	39°05′32″N 008°58′03″W	
LPOV		Ovar Air Base	Maceda, Ovar	40°54′57″N 008°38′45″W	
LPPA		Penafiel Hospital Heliport	Penafiel	41°11′45″N 008°18′36″W	
LPPB		Paredes Baltar Heliport	Baltar	41°11′24″N 008°23′08″W	
LPPD	PDL	João Paulo II Airport (John Paul II Airport/Ponta Delgada Airport)	Ponta Delgada / São Miguel Island	37°44′28″N 025°41′52″W	
LPPH		Matosinhos Pedro Hispano Hospital Heliport	Matosinhos	41°10′52″N 008°39′45″W	
LPPI	PIX	Pico Airport	Madalena / Pico Island	38°33′16″N 028°26′29″W	
LPPJ		Beja Heliport	Beja	38°03′29″N 007°52′31″W	
LPPM	PRM	Portimão Airport	Portimão, Barlavento Algarvio	37°08′51″N 008°34′47″W	
LPPN		Proença-a-Nova Airport	Proença-a-Nova	39°43′52″N 007°52′29″W	
LPPR	OPO	Porto Airport (Francisco Sá Carneiro Airport)	Porto	41°14′08″N 008°40′41″W	
LPPS	PXO	Porto Santo Airport	Vila Baleira / Porto Santo Island	33°04′15″N 016°20′59″W	
LPPT	LIS	Lisbon Airport (Humberto Delgado Airport)	Portela / Lisbon	38°46′27″N 009°08′03″W	
LPPV		Praia Verde Airport	Altura	37°11′35″N 007°28′15″W	
LPSA		Salemas Heliport	Loures	38°52′30″N 009°11′42″W	
LPSC		Santa Cruz Airport	Santa Cruz, Torres Vedras	39°07′27″N 009°22′49″W	
LPSD		Sardoal Heliport	Sardoal	39°32′33″N 008°09′37″W	
LPSE		Seia Airport	Seia	40°27′11″N 007°41′31″W	
LPSI	SIE	Sines Heliport	Sines / Alentejo Litoral	37°57′18″N 008°52′46″W	
LPSJ	SJZ	São Jorge Airport	Velas / São Jorge Island	38°39′55″N 028°10′29″W	
LPSM		Lisbon Santa Maria Hospital Heliport	Alvalade, Lisbon	38°44′58″N 009°09′38″W	
LPSO	QPS	Ponte de Sor Aerodrome	Ponte de Sor	39°12′42″N 008°03′27″W	
LPSR		Santarém Airport	Santarém	39°12′34″N 008°41′14″W	
LPSS		Santa Maria da Feira Hospital Heliport	Santa Maria da Feira	40°55′46″N 008°32′54″W	
LPST		Sintra Air Base	Granja do Marquês / Pero Pinheiro, Sintra	38°49′52″N 009°20′22″W	
LPTH		Tomar Hospital Heliport	Tomar	39°36′38″N 008°23′43″W	
LPTM		Bragança Hospital Heliport	Bragança	41°48′10″N 006°46′08″W	
LPTN		Tancos Air Base	Tancos, Vila Nova da Barquinha, Médio Tejo	39°28′31″N 008°21′52″W	
LPTT		Viseu Hospital Heliport	Viseu	40°38′57″N 007°54′21″W	
LPVC		Viana do Castelo Hospital Heliport	Viana do Castelo	41°41′52″N 008°49′53″W	
LPVL		Maia Airport (Vilar da Luz Airport)	Maia	41°16′45″N 008°31′02″W	
LPVM		Vilamoura Airport	Vilamoura / Quarteira, Loulé	37°06′24″N 008°08′24″W	Closed
LPVR	VRL	Vila Real Airport	Vila Real / Alto Douro	41°16′39″N 007°43′11″W	
LPVZ	VSE	Viseu Airport (Gonçalves Lobato Airport)	Lordosa, Viséu	40°43′40″N 007°53′21″W	
LPXR		Vila Franca de Xira Hospital Heliport	Vila Franca de Xira	38°58′40″N 008°59′07″W	

== LQ – Bosnia and Herzegovina ==
Also see airport category and list.

ICAO	IATA	Airport name	Community	Coordinates	Notes
LQBI		Bihać Golubić Airport	Bihać	44°47′50″N 015°54′16″E	
LQBK	BNX	Banja Luka International Airport (Mahovljani Airport)	Banja Luka	44°56′10″N 017°17′57″E	
LQBU		Sarajevo Butmir Airport	Butmir	43°48′30″N 018°20′11″E	
LQBZ		Banja Luka Zalužani Airport	Banja Luka	44°50′55″N 017°13′15″E	
LQCG		Živinice-Ciljuge Airport	Živinice	44°26′10″N 018°41′11″E	
LQDZ		Bijeljina Dragon Airport	Bijeljina	44°40′38″N 019°07′47″E	
LQGL		Glamoč Air Base	Glamoč	44°05′02″N 016°48′48″E	Closed
LQGO		Gorice-Brčko Airport	Gorice	44°54′45″N 018°44′14″E	
LQJL		Tuzla Jegen Lug Airport	Tuzla	44°27′28″N 018°48′30″E	
LQKR		Kreševo Airport	Kreševo	43°53′09″N 018°04′06″E	
LQLH		Tarčin Airport	Tarčin	43°48′51″N 018°07′06″E	
LQLV		Livno Airport	Livno	43°47′35″N 016°54′25″E	
LQMG		Camp McGovern AHP Heliport	Brčko	44°51′17″N 018°45′15″E	
LQMJ		Mostar Jasenica Airport	Mostar	43°16′52″N 017°48′14″E	
LQMO	OMO	Mostar International Airport	Mostar	43°16′58″N 017°50′45″E	
LQMP		Medeno Polje Airport	Medeno Polje	44°34′26″N 016°16′56″E	
LQNI		Nišići Airport	Nišići	44°04′10″N 018°30′32″E	
LQPD		Prijedor Airport	Prijedor	44°59′38″N 016°44′12″E	
LQPP		Popovi Airport	Popovi	44°46′04″N 019°17′51″E	
LQSA	SJJ	Sarajevo International Airport	Sarajevo	43°49′29″N 018°19′53″E	
LQSC		Glasinac-Sokolac Airport	Sokolac	43°53′54″N 018°48′20″E	Closed
LQTZ	TZL	Tuzla International Airport	Tuzla	44°27′31″N 018°43′29″E	
LQVI		Visoko Airport	Visoko	44°01′30″N 018°05′50″E	
LQVK		Velika Kladusa Airport	Velika Kladusa	45°10′50″N 015°49′14″E	Closed

== LR – Romania ==
Also see airport category and list.

ICAO	IATA	Airport name	Community	Coordinates
LRAR	ARW	Arad International Airport	Arad	46°10′36″N 021°15′43″E
LRBA		Gradistea Airport	Comana	44°13′30″N 026°07′17″E
LRBC	BCM	George Enescu International Airport	Bacău	46°31′19″N 026°54′37″E
LRBG		IAR Gimbav Heliport	Brașov	45°41′51″N 025°32′02″E
LRBM	BAY	Maramureş International Airport	Baia Mare	47°39′30″N 023°27′59″E
LRBN	BST	Bistrița Airport	Bistrița	47°09′30″N 024°33′06″E
LRBO		Aurel Vlaicu Flight School	Cochirleanca	45°13′04″N 026°58′29″E
LRBS	BBU	Bucharest "Aurel Vlaicu" International Airport (Băneasa Airport)	Bucharest	44°30′13″N 026°06′13″E
LRBV	GHV	Brașov-Ghimbav International Airport	Ghimbav	45°42′06″N 025°31′12″E
LRCB		Arad-Șiria Airport	Șiria	46°16′08″N 021°36′19″E
LRCD		Măgura Airport	Cisnădie	45°44′21″N 024°09′50″E
LRCJ		Dezmir Airport	Apahida	46°46′45″N 023°42′50″E
LRCK	CND	Constanța "Mihail Kogălniceanu" International Airport	Constanța	44°21′44″N 028°29′18″E
LRCL	CLJ	Cluj International Airport	Cluj-Napoca	46°47′06″N 023°41′10″E
LRCN		Clinceni Aerodrome	Clinceni	44°21′38″N 025°55′54″E
LRCR		Corona Aerodrome	Prejmer	45°40′51″N 025°44′42″E
LRCS	CSB	Caransebeș Airport	Reșița	45°25′13″N 022°15′08″E
LRCT		Câmpia Turzii Airport	Câmpia Turzii	46°30′08″N 023°53′09″E
LRCV	CRA	Craiova International Airport	Craiova	44°19′05″N 023°53′19″E
LRCW		Craiova-Sud Airport	Podari	44°17′12″N 023°47′28″E
LRDV		Șăulești Airport	Simeria	45°51′51″N 022°57′54″E
LRFT		Fetești Airport	Fetești	44°23′44″N 027°43′32″E
LRHR		Remetea Airport	Remetea	46°49′21″N 025°24′26″E
LRIA	IAS	Iași International Airport	Iași	47°10′44″N 027°37′12″E
LRIS		Iași-Sud Airport	Iași	47°09′28″N 027°38′15″E
LRMS		Târgu Mureș Recreational Airfield	Târgu Mureș	46°32′03″N 024°32′05″E
LROD	OMR	Oradea International Airport	Oradea	47°01′31″N 021°54′09″E
LROP	OTP	Bucharest "Henri Coandă" International Airport	Bucharest	44°34′16″N 026°05′06″E
LRPT		Geamăna Airport	Bradu	44°48′58″N 024°53′43″E
LRPW		Ploiești Strejnicu Recreational Airfield	Târgșoru Vechi	44°55′25″N 025°57′48″E
LRSB	SBZ	Sibiu International Airport	Sibiu	45°47′09″N 024°05′08″E
LRSM	SUJ	Satu Mare International Airport	Satu Mare	47°42′12″N 022°53′08″E
LRSP		Sânpetru Airfield	Sânpetru	45°43′08″N 025°38′01″E
LRSV	SCV	Suceava International Airport (Ștefan cel Mare Airport)	Suceava	47°41′15″N 026°21′15″E
LRTC	TCE	Tulcea Airport	Tulcea	45°03′46″N 028°42′52″E
LRTM	TGM	Târgu Mureș International Airport (Transilvania Airport)	Târgu-Mureș	46°28′04″N 024°24′45″E
LRTR	TSR	Timișoara "Traian Vuia" International Airport	Timișoara	45°48′36″N 021°20′17″E
LRTZ		Tuzla Alexandru Podgoreanu International Airport	Tuzla	43°59′08″N 028°36′53″E
LRZN		Piatra Neamț Airport	Piatra Neamț	46°50′41″N 026°33′29″E

== LS – Switzerland and Liechtenstein ==
Also see airport category and list.

ICAO	IATA	Airport name	Community	Coordinates	Notes
LSER		Raron Heliport	Raron	46°18′06″N 007°49′59″E	
LSEY		Leysin Heliport	Leysin	46°20′30″N 007°01′13″E	
LSEZ		Zermatt Heliport	Zermatt	46°01′46″N 007°45′12″E	
LSGB		Bex Airport	Bex	46°15′29″N 006°59′11″E	
LSGC	ZHV	Les Eplatures Airport	La Chaux-de-Fonds	47°05′02″N 006°47′34″E	
LSGE		Fribourg-Ecuvillens Airfield	Fribourg	46°45′30″N 007°04′57″E	
LSGG	GVA	Geneva Airport (Cointrin Airport)	Geneva	46°14′15″N 006°06′33″E	
LSGK	VVL	Saanen Airport	Saanen	46°29′12″N 007°15′00″E	
LSGL	QYL	Lausanne Airport	Lausanne	46°32′43″N 006°37′00″E	
LSGN	QNC	Neuchâtel Airport	Neuchâtel	46°57′27″N 006°51′54″E	
LSGP		La Côte Airport	La Côte	46°24′23″N 006°15′29″E	
LSGR		Reichenbach Airport	Reichenbach	46°36′49″N 007°40′40″E	
LSGS	SIR	Sion Airport	Sion	46°13′11″N 007°19′36″E	Civilian flights only
LSGT		Gruyères Airport	Gruyères	46°35′39″N 007°05′40″E	
LSGY		Yverdon-les-Bains Airport	Yverdon-les-Bains	46°45′43″N 006°36′48″E	
LSHC		Collombey-Muraz Heliport	Collombey-Muraz	46°16′07″N 006°57′35″E	
LSHG		Gampel Heliport	Gampel	46°18′36″N 007°43′29″E	
LSMA		Alpnach Air Base	Alpnach	46°56′19″N 008°17′03″E	
LSMD		Dübendorf Air Base	Dübendorf	47°23′55″N 008°38′53″E	
LSME	EML	Emmen Air Base	Emmen	47°05′32″N 008°18′16″E	
LSMI		Interlaken Air Base	Interlaken	46°40′35″N 007°52′44″E	Closed
LSMM		Meiringen Air Base	Meiringen	46°44′25″N 008°06′36″E	
LSMP	VIP	Payerne Air Base	Payerne	46°50′36″N 006°54′54″E	
LSPA		Amlikon Airport	Amlikon	47°34′27″N 009°02′51″E	
LSPD		Dittingen Airport	Dittingen	47°26′19″N 007°29′29″E	
LSPF		Schaffhausen Airport	Schaffhausen	47°41′26″N 008°31′37″E	
LSPG		Kägiswil Airport	Kägiswil	46°54′27″N 008°15′11″E	
LSPH		Winterthur Airport	Winterthur	47°30′54″N 008°46′19″E	
LSPK		Hasenstrick Airport	Hasenstrick	47°16′48″N 008°52′55″E	
LSPL		Langenthal Airport	Langenthal	47°10′59″N 007°44′30″E	
LSPM		Ambri Airport	Ambrì	46°30′47″N 008°41′22″E	
LSPN		Triengen Airport	Triengen	47°13′36″N 008°04′41″E	
LSPO		Olten Airport	Olten	47°20′29″N 007°53′04″E	
LSPR		Lodrino Air Base	Lodrino Air Base	46°17′39″N 008°59′34″E	
LSPU		Münster Aero Airfield	Münster	46°28′48″N 008°15′48″E	
LSPV		Wangen-Lachen Airport	Wangen	47°12′17″N 008°52′03″E	
LSTA		Raron Airfield	Raron	46°18′16″N 007°49′18″E	
LSTB		Bellechasse Airport	Bellechasse	46°58′46″N 007°07′57″E	
LSTO		Môtiers Airport	Môtiers	46°55′00″N 006°36′55″E	
LSTR		Montricher Airport	Montricher	46°35′25″N 006°24′02″E	
LSTS		St. Stephan Airport	St. Stephan	46°29′52″N 007°24′43″E	
LSTZ		Zweisimmen Airfield	Zweisimmen	46°33′06″N 007°22′52″E	
LSVD		Clariden-Hüfifirn Glacier Landing Strip	Planurahütte	46°49′19″N 008°52′49″E	
LSVP		Petersgrat Glacier Altiport	Blatten	46°28′08″N 007°49′42″E	
LSVV		Vorab Glacier Landing Strip	Glarus Süd	46°52′42″N 009°09′07″E	
LSXA		Tavanasa Heliport	Tavanasa	46°45′38″N 009°05′36″E	
LSXB		Balzers Heliport	Balzers	47°04′05″N 009°28′52″E	
LSXE		Erstfeld Heliport	Erstfeld	46°50′03″N 008°38′19″E	
LSXG		Gsteigwiler Heliport	Gsteigwiler	46°38′52″N 007°52′42″E	
LSXH		Holziken Heliport	Holziken	47°18′51″N 008°01′34″E	
LSXI		Interlaken Heliport	Interlaken	46°40′13″N 007°52′35″E	
LSXK		Benken Heliport	Benken	47°12′15″N 009°00′22″E	
LSXL		Lauterbrunnen Heliport	Lauterbrunnen	46°35′08″N 007°54′49″E	
LSXO		St. Gallen-Winkeln Heliport	St. Gallen	47°24′20″N 009°17′25″E	
LSXS		Schindellegi Heliport	Schindellegi	47°10′13″N 008°42′51″E	
LSXT		Trogen Heliport	Trogen	47°24′32″N 009°28′23″E	
LSXU		Untervaz Heliport	Untervaz	46°54′45″N 009°33′03″E	
LSXV		San Vittore Heliport	San Vittore	46°13′56″N 009°05′22″E	
LSXW		Würenlingen Heliport	Würenlingen	46°20′30″N 007°01′13″E	
LSXY		Leysin Heliport	Leysin	46°20′29″N 007°01′27″E	
LSYI		Limmerenfirn Heliport	Glarus Süd	46°48′38″N 008°58′04″E	
LSYK		Kanderfirn Mountain Landing Site	Kandersteg	46°29′09″N 007°49′42″E	
LSYQ		Croix de Coeur Altiport	Riddes	46°07′24″N 007°14′03″E	
LSYR		Rosa Blanche Mountain Landing Site	Nendaz	46°03′39″N 007°21′17″E	
LSYX		Trient Glacier Landing Site	Trient	45°59′18″N 007°02′33″E	
LSYZ		Tsanfleuron Glacier Altiport	Savièse	46°19′14″N 007°13′58″E	
LSZA	LUG	Lugano Airport	Lugano / Agno	46°00′13″N 008°54′37″E	
LSZB	BRN	Bern Airport	Bern (Berne) / Belp	46°54′44″N 007°29′57″E	
LSZC	BXO	Buochs Airport	Buochs	46°58′28″N 008°23′49″E	
LSZD		Ascona Airfield	Ascona	46°09′28″N 008°46′55″E	Closed
LSZE		Bad Ragaz Airport	Bad Ragaz	47°00′54″N 009°28′55″E	
LSZF		Birrfeld Airport	Birrfeld	47°26′37″N 008°14′01″E	
LSZG		Grenchen Airport	Grenchen	47°10′53″N 007°25′01″E	
LSZH	ZRH	Zurich Airport (Zurich-Kloten Airport)	Zürich / Kloten	47°27′53″N 008°32′57″E	
LSZI		Fricktal-Schupfart Airport	Fricktal	47°30′32″N 007°57′00″E	
LSZJ		Courtelary Airport	Courtelary	47°11′00″N 007°05′27″E	
LSZK		Speck-Fehraltorf Airport	Speck	47°22′35″N 008°45′27″E	
LSZL	ZJI	Locarno Airport	Locarno	46°09′55″N 008°52′40″E	
LSZM		Mollis Airport	Mollis	47°04′45″N 009°03′54″E	
LSZN		Hausen am Albis Airport	Hausen am Albis	47°14′20″N 008°30′56″E	
LSZO		Luzern-Beromünster Airport	Luzern	47°11′24″N 008°12′17″E	
LSZP		Biel-Kappelen Airport	Biel	47°05′21″N 007°17′24″E	
LSZQ		Bressaucourt Airport	Bressaucourt	47°23′33″N 007°01′44″E	
LSZR	ACH	St. Gallen-Altenrhein Airport	St. Gallen / Altenrhein	47°29′08″N 009°33′40″E	
LSZS	SMV	Samedan Airport (Engadin Airport)	Samedan	46°32′02″N 009°53′02″E	
LSZT		Lommis Airport	Lommis	47°31′29″N 009°00′13″E	
LSZU		Buttwil Airport	Buttwil	47°15′53″N 008°18′09″E	
LSZV		Sitterdorf Airport	Sitterdorf	47°30′32″N 009°15′46″E	
LSZW		Thun Airport	Thun	46°45′23″N 007°36′02″E	
LSZX		Schänis Airport	Schänis	47°10′18″N 009°02′22″E	
LSZY		Porrentruy Airport	Porrentruy	47°24′38″N 007°03′06″E	Closed

== LT – Türkiye ==
Also see airport category and list.

ICAO	IATA	Airport name	Community	Coordinates	Notes
LTAB		Ankara Güvercinlik Army Air Base	Güvercinlik / Ankara	39°56′05″N 032°44′26″E	
LTAC	ESB	Esenboğa International Airport	Ankara	40°07′41″N 032°59′42″E	
LTAD	ANK	Etimesgut Air Base	Ankara	39°56′59″N 032°41′19″E	
LTAE		Mürted Air Base	Ankara	40°04′44″N 032°33′56″E	
LTAF	ADA	Adana Şakirpaşa Airport	Adana	36°58′55″N 035°16′49″E	
LTAG	UAB	Incirlik Air Base	Adana	37°00′07″N 035°25′33″E	
LTAH	AFY	Afyon Airport	Afyonkarahisar	38°43′35″N 030°36′04″E	
LTAI	AYT	Antalya Airport	Antalya	36°54′01″N 030°47′34″E	
LTAJ	GZT	Oğuzeli Airport	Gaziantep	36°56′52″N 037°28′44″E	
LTAK		İskenderun Airport	İskenderun, Hatay	36°34′28″N 036°09′12″E	Closed
LTAL	KFS	Kastamonu Airport	Kastamonu	41°18′50″N 033°47′42″E	
LTAN	KYA	Konya Airport	Konya	37°58′44″N 032°33′42″E	
LTAO		Malatya Tulga Air Base	Malatya	38°21′14″N 038°15′14″E	
LTAP	MZH	Amasya Merzifon Airport	Merzifon, Amasya	40°49′45″N 035°31′19″E	
LTAQ	SSX	Samsun Samair Airport	Samsun	41°16′43″N 036°18′19″E	
LTAR	VAS	Sivas Airport (Nuri Demirag Airport)	Sivas	39°46′00″N 037°01′00″E	
LTAS	ONQ	Zonguldak Airport	Zonguldak	41°30′23″N 032°05′19″E	
LTAT	MLX	Malatya Erhaç Airport	Malatya	38°26′07″N 038°05′27″E	
LTAU	ASR	Erkilet International Airport (Kayseri Erkilet Airport)	Kayseri	38°46′13″N 035°29′43″E	
LTAV		Sivrihisar Air Base	Sivrihisar, Eskişehir	39°27′05″N 031°21′55″E	
LTAW	TJK	Tokat Airport	Tokat	40°18′42″N 036°22′25″E	
LTAX		Ereğli Erdemir Airport	Karadeniz Ereğli, Zonguldak	41°15′05″N 031°24′39″E	Closed
LTAY	DNZ	Denizli Çardak Airport	Denizli	37°47′08″N 029°42′04″E	
LTAZ	NAV	Nevşehir Kapadokya Airport	Nevşehir	38°46′08″N 034°31′35″E	
LTBA	ISL	Atatürk International Airport	Istanbul	40°58′34″N 028°48′51″E	
LTBC		Alaşehir Airport	Alaşehir, Manisa	38°22′12″N 028°33′26″E	
LTBD		Aydın Airport	Aydın	37°48′54″N 027°53′21″E	
LTBE	BTZ	Bursa Airport	Bursa	40°13′50″N 029°00′40″E	
LTBF	BZI	Balıkesir Airport	Balıkesir	39°37′09″N 027°55′33″E	
LTBG	BDM	Bandırma Airport	Bandırma, Balıkesir	40°19′04″N 027°58′39″E	
LTBH	CKZ	Çanakkale Airport	Çanakkale	40°08′15″N 026°25′36″E	
LTBI	ESK	Eskişehir Airport	Eskişehir	39°47′02″N 030°34′55″E	
LTBJ	ADB	Adnan Menderes Airport	İzmir	38°17′21″N 027°09′18″E	
LTBK		Gaziemir Air Base	İzmir	38°19′08″N 027°09′33″E	
LTBL	IGL	Çiğli Airport	İzmir	38°30′46″N 027°00′36″E	
LTBM		Isparta Airport	Isparta	37°47′15″N 030°35′18″E	
LTBN		Kütahya Air Base	Kütahya	39°25′36″N 030°01′00″E	
LTBO	USQ	Uşak Airport	Uşak	38°40′47″N 029°28′54″E	
LTBP		Yalova Air Base	Yalova	40°41′02″N 029°22′34″E	
LTBQ	KCO	Cengiz Topel Naval Air Station	Kocaeli	40°44′06″N 030°05′00″E	
LTBR	YEI	Yenişehir Airport	Bursa	40°15′18″N 029°33′45″E	
LTBS	DLM	Dalaman Airport	Dalaman, Muğla	36°42′53″N 028°47′34″E	
LTBT		Akhisar Air Base	Akhisar, Manisa	38°48′34″N 027°50′06″E	
LTBU	TEQ	Tekirdağ Çorlu Airport	Çorlu, Tekirdağ	41°08′18″N 027°55′09″E	
LTBV	BXN	Bodrum-Imsik Airport	Bodrum	37°08′25″N 027°40′11″E	Closed
LTBW		Istanbul Hezarfen Airfield	Istanbul	41°06′16″N 028°33′00″E	
LTBX		Istanbul Samandıra Army Air Base	Istanbul	40°59′34″N 029°12′56″E	
LTBY	AOE	Hasan Polatkan Airport	Eskişehir	39°48′36″N 030°31′10″E	
LTBZ	KZR	Zafer Airport	Kütahya	39°06′41″N 030°07′47″E	
LTCA	EZS	Elazığ Airport	Elazığ	38°36′24″N 039°17′29″E	
LTCB	OGU	Ordu-Giresun Airport	Ordu	40°58′05″N 038°04′35″E	
LTCC	DIY	Diyarbakır Airport	Diyarbakır	37°53′38″N 040°12′03″E	
LTCD	ERC	Erzincan Airport	Erzincan	39°42′36″N 039°31′37″E	
LTCE	ERZ	Erzurum Airport	Erzurum	39°57′19″N 041°10′09″E	
LTCF	KSY	Kars Harakani Airport	Kars	40°33′44″N 043°06′54″E	
LTCG	TZX	Trabzon Airport	Trabzon	40°59′42″N 039°47′23″E	
LTCH	SFQ	Şanlıurfa Airport	Şanlıurfa	37°06′01″N 038°50′34″E	Closed
LTCI	VAN	Van Ferit Melen Airport	Van	38°28′06″N 043°19′56″E	
LTCJ	BAL	Batman Airport	Batman	37°55′56″N 041°06′59″E	
LTCK	MSR	Muş Airport (Sultan Alparsian Airport)	Muş	38°44′41″N 041°39′14″E	
LTCL	SXZ	Siirt Airport	Siirt	37°58′00″N 041°50′00″E	
LTCM	NOP	Sinop Airport	Sinop	42°00′57″N 035°03′59″E	
LTCN	KCM	Kahramanmaraş Airport	Kahramanmaraş	37°32′20″N 036°57′12″E	
LTCO	AJI	Ağrı Airport (Ahmed-i Hami Airport)	Ağrı	39°39′16″N 043°01′38″E	
LTCP	ADF	Adıyaman Airport	Adıyaman	37°43′54″N 038°28′08″E	
LTCR	MQM	Mardin Airport	Mardin	37°13′58″N 040°38′26″E	
LTCS	GNY	Şanlıurfa GAP Airport	Şanlıurfa	37°27′00″N 038°54′00″E	
LTCT	IGD	Iğdır Airport	Iğdır	39°58′59″N 043°51′59″E	
LTCU	BGG	Bingöl Airport	Bingöl	38°51′36″N 040°35′38″E	
LTCV	NKT	Şırnak Airport (Şerafettin Elçi Airport)	Cizre	37°21′48″N 042°03′35″E	
LTCW	YKO	Hakkari–Yüksekova Airport (Selahaddin Eyyubi Airport)	Yüksekova	37°33′06″N 044°14′01″E	
LTDA	HTY	Hatay Airport	Antakya, Hatay	36°21′46″N 036°16′56″E	
LTDB	COV	Çukurova International Airport	Tarsus, Mersin	36°53′49″N 035°04′03″E	
LTFA		Kaklıç Air Base	İzmir	38°31′26″N 026°58′28″E	
LTFB		Selçuk-Efes Airport	Selçuk, İzmir	37°57′02″N 027°19′45″E	
LTFC	ISE	Isparta Süleyman Demirel Airport	Isparta	37°51′54″N 030°22′55″E	
LTFD	EDO	Balıkesir Koca Seyit Airport	Edremit, Balıkesir	39°33′16″N 027°00′49″E	
LTFE	BJV	Milas–Bodrum Airport	Milas, Muğla	37°15′02″N 027°39′51″E	
LTFG	GZP	Gazipaşa-Alanya Airport	Gazipaşa, Antalya	36°17′57″N 032°18′05″E	
LTFH	SZF	Samsun-Çarşamba Airport	Samsun	41°15′56″N 036°32′55″E	
LTFJ	SAW	Sabiha Gökçen International Airport	Istanbul	40°53′54″N 029°18′33″E	
LTFK	GKD	Gökçeada Airport	Gökçeada, Çanakkale	40°12′04″N 025°52′56″E	
LTFL		Keşan Air Base	Keşan	40°47′14″N 026°36′24″E	
LTFM	IST	Istanbul Airport	Istanbul	41°15′46″N 028°44′28″E	
LTFN		Isparta Kılıç Airfield	Keçiborlu	37°51′49″N 030°21′18″E	
LTFO	RZV	Rize–Artvin Airport	Rize Province	41°10′09″N 040°49′44″E	
LTON		19 Mayıs Airport	19 Mayıs	41°30′46″N 036°07′13″E	
LTXE		Karain Airfield	Döşemealtı	37°05′50″N 030°38′54″E	

== LU – Moldova ==
Also see airport category and list.

ICAO	IATA	Airport name	Community	Coordinates	Notes
LUBA		Bălți City Airport	Bălți	47°46′28″N 027°57′21″E	Closed
LUBL	BZY	Bălți International Airport	Bălți	47°50′37″N 027°46′46″E	
LUBM		Mărculești Air Force Base	Mărculești	47°51′34″N 028°12′50″E	
LUCH		Cahul International Airport	Cahul	45°50′37″N 028°15′48″E	
LUCL		Ceadîr-Lunga Airport	Ceadîr-Lunga	46°02′01″N 028°51′11″E	
LUCM		Camenca Airport	Camenca	48°01′01″N 028°43′01″E	
LUKE		Vinaria Et Cetera Airport	Crocmaz	46°27′11″N 029°55′33″E	
LUKH		Horești Airport	Horești	46°50′04″N 028°54′07″E	
LUKK	RMO	Chișinău International Airport	Chișinău	46°55′44″N 028°56′04″E	
LUKV		Vadul lui Vodă Airport	Vadul lui Vodă	47°04′02″N 029°05′37″E	
LUSR		Soroca Airport	Soroca	48°11′56″N 028°18′44″E	
LUTG		Tighina Airport	Tighina	46°49′59″N 029°28′59″E	
LUTR		Tiraspol Airport	Tiraspol	46°52′07″N 029°35′13″E	

== LV – Palestine ==
Also see airport category and list.

ICAO	IATA	Airport name	Community	Coordinates	
LVGZ	GZA	Yasser Arafat International Airport (formerly Gaza International Airport)	Rafah	31°14′47″N 034°16′34″E	Closed

== LW – North Macedonia ==
Also see airport category and list.

ICAO	IATA	Airport name	Community	Coordinates
LWBT		Logovardi Airfield	Bitola	41°01′25″N 021°25′32″E
LWKU		Adzi Tepe Airport	Kumanovo	42°09′29″N 021°41′36″E
LWOH	OHD	Ohrid St. Paul the Apostle Airport	Ohrid	41°10′48″N 020°44′32″E
LWPP		Malo Konjari Recreational Airfield	Malo Konjari	41°19′59″N 021°26′57″E
LWSK	SKP	Skopje International Airport	Skopje	41°57′40″N 021°37′37″E
LWSN		Stenkovec Brazda Airfield	Brazda	42°03′35″N 021°23′17″E
LWST		Sushevo Recreational Airfield	Tri Češmi	41°45′35″N 022°08′52″E

== LX – Gibraltar ==
Also see airport category and list.

ICAO	IATA	Airport name	Community	Coordinates
LXGB	GIB	Gibraltar International Airport	Gibraltar	36°09′04″N 005°20′59″W

== LY – Montenegro and Serbia ==
Also see airport category and list.

ICAO	IATA	Airport name	Community	Coordinates	Notes
LYBE	BEG	Belgrade Airport (Nikola Tesla Airport)	Belgrade	44°49′10″N 020°18′25″E	
LYBJ	LJB	Lisičji Jarak Airport	Padinska Skela / Belgrade	44°56′13″N 020°26′33″E	
LYBO		Bor Airfield	Bor	44°01′06″N 022°08′14″E	
LYBR	IVG	Berane Airport (Dolac Airport)	Berane, Montenegro	42°50′21″N 019°51′43″E	
LYBT	BJY	Batajnica Air Base	Batajnica / Belgrade	44°56′07″N 020°15′27″E	
LYCA		Čačak Airfield	Čačak	43°53′54″N 020°26′04″E	
LYCU		Ćuprija Airfield	Ćuprija	43°56′26″N 021°24′32″E	
LYJA		Jagodina Airfield	Jagodina	43°58′36″N 021°13′59″E	
LYKA		Kraljevo Airfield	Kraljevo	43°43′50″N 020°43′26″E	
LYKG		Kragujevac Airfield	Kragujevac	44°07′36″N 020°51′21″E	
LYKI		Kikinda Airfield	Kikinda	45°46′01″N 020°25′11″E	
LYKS		Rosulje Airport	Kruševac	43°33′40″N 021°22′58″E	
LYKT		Kostolac Airfield	Kostolac	44°44′06″N 021°09′42″E	
LYKU		Kula Airfield	Kula	45°38′29″N 019°29′36″E	
LYKV	KVO	Morava Airport (Lađevci Airport)	Kraljevo	43°49′07″N 020°35′07″E	
LYKZ		Knjaževac Airfield	Knjaževac	43°41′22″N 022°17′47″E	Closed
LYLE		Leskovac Airfield	Leskovac	43°01′07″N 021°56′02″E	
LYNI	INI	Niš Constantine the Great Airport	Niš	43°20′14″N 021°51′13″E	
LYNK		Kapino Polje Airport	Nikšić, Montenegro	42°46′28″N 018°54′54″E	
LYNS	QND	Novi Sad Airport (Čenej Airport)	Novi Sad	45°23′09″N 019°50′02″E	
LYPA		Pančevo Airport	Pančevo	44°54′08″N 020°38′07″E	
LYPB		Progar Airfield	Progar	44°43′23″N 020°10′51″E	
LYPG	TGD	Podgorica Airport	Podgorica, Montenegro	42°21′34″N 019°15′07″E	
LYPJ		Podgorica Airbase	Golubovci, Montenegro	42°21′34″N 019°15′07″E	
LYPN		Paraćin Airfield	Paraćin	43°51′59″N 021°29′14″E	
LYPO		Špiro Mugoša Airport (Ćemovsko Polje Airport)	Podgorica, Montenegro	42°25′20″N 019°17′27″E	
LYSD		Smederevo Airfield	Smederevo	44°38′41″N 020°57′47″E	
LYSJ		Dubinje Air Base	Sjenica	43°16′28″N 020°03′01″E	
LYSM		Sremska Mitrovica Airfield	Sremska Mitrovica	45°02′15″N 019°39′45″E	
LYSO		Sombor Air Base	Sombor	45°43′20″N 019°03′29″E	
LYSP		Smederevska Palanka Airfield	Smederevska Palanka	44°21′00″N 020°57′35″E	
LYSU		Subotica Airfield	Subotica	46°01′22″N 019°42′21″E	
LYTR	TRE	Trstenik Airport	Trstenik	43°36′51″N 021°01′49″E	
LYTV	TIV	Tivat Airport	Tivat, Montenegro	42°24′17″N 018°43′24″E	
LYUZ	UZC	Ponikve Airport	Užice	43°53′56″N 019°41′52″E	
LYVA		Valjevo Airfield	Valjevo	44°17′52″N 020°01′19″E	
LYVJ		Vojka Nova Pazova Airfield	Vojka	44°56′02″N 020°10′25″E	
LYVR		Vršac Airport	Vršac	45°08′52″N 021°18′35″E	
LYZP		Zemun Polje Airfield	Zemun	44°52′35″N 020°18′18″E	
LYZR		Zrenjanin Airport	Zrenjanin	45°20′23″N 020°27′15″E	

== LZ – Slovakia ==
Also see airport category and list.

ICAO	IATA	Airport name	Community	Coordinates	Notes
LZBD		Bidovce Airport	Bidovce	48°44′35″N 021°24′55″E	
LZDB		Slavnica Airfield	Dubnica nad Váhom	48°59′49″N 018°11′32″E	
LZDN		Dobrá Niva Airfield	Dobrá Niva	48°29′18″N 019°06′05″E	
LZDV		Dubová Airfield	Dubová	48°20′49″N 017°21′24″E	
LZHL		Holíč Airfield	Holíč	48°48′27″N 017°08′11″E	
LZIB	BTS	Bratislava Airport (Milan Rastislav Štefánik Airport)	Bratislava	48°10′12″N 017°12′45″E	
LZJS		Aerodrome Jasna	Jasná	49°02′52″N 019°30′24″E	
LZKA		Komoča Airfield	Komoča	47°58′14″N 018°02′26″E	
LZKC		Kamenica nad Cirochou Airport	Kamenica nad Cirochou	48°56′13″N 021°59′41″E	
LZKS		Kráľová Airport	Kráľová pri Senci	48°12′06″N 017°28′30″E	
LZKZ	KSC	Košice International Airport	Košice	48°39′47″N 021°14′28″E	
LZLU	LUE	Boľkovce Airport	Lučenec	48°39′47″N 021°14′28″E	
LZMA		Martin Airfield	Martin	48°20′22″N 019°44′09″E	
LZMC		Malacky Air Base	Malacky	49°03′55″N 018°57′03″E	
LZNI		Nitra Airport	Nitra	48°24′07″N 017°07′06″E	
LZNZ		Nové Zámky Airport	Nové Zámky	48°16′46″N 018°07′58″E	
LZOC		Očová Airport	Očová	47°57′39″N 018°11′10″E	
LZPE		Prievidza Airport	Prievidza	48°45′58″N 018°35′12″E	
LZPP	PZY	Piešťany Airport	Piešťany	48°37′30″N 017°49′42″E	
LZPT		Malé Bielice Airport	Partizánske	48°37′13″N 018°20′00″E	
LZPW	POV	Prešov Air Base	Prešov	49°01′47″N 021°18′56″E	
LZRU		Ružomberok Airport	Ružomberok	49°05′09″N 019°22′13″E	
LZRY		Ražňany Airport	Ražňany	49°04′41″N 021°05′59″E	
LZSE		Senica Airport	Senica	48°39′28″N 017°19′47″E	
LZSK		Svidník Airport	Svidník	49°20′03″N 021°34′13″E	
LZSL	SLD	Sliač Airport (Letisko Tri Duby Airport)	Sliač	48°38′16″N 019°08′02″E	
LZSV		Spišská Nová Ves Airport	Spišská Nová Ves	48°56′27″N 020°32′02″E	
LZSY		Šurany Airport	Šurany	48°04′34″N 018°06′49″E	
LZTN		Trenčín Airfield	Trenčín	48°51′54″N 017°59′32″E	
LZTR		Boleráz Airport	Trnava	48°27′05″N 017°31′53″E	
LZTT	TAT	Poprad-Tatry Airport	Poprad	49°04′24″N 020°14′28″E	
LZVB		Vajnory Airport	Vajnory	48°12′09″N 017°11′22″E	Closed
LZZA		Bytča Airport	Bytča	49°13′53″N 018°36′48″E	
LZZH		Janova Lehota Airfield	Žiar nad Hronom	48°38′15″N 018°47′50″E	Open from March 2026
LZZI	ILZ	Žilina Airport	Žilina	49°13′53″N 018°36′48″E	
