= Požarevac Airfield =

Former airfield in Požarevac, Serbia

Coordinates: 44°36′50″N 21°11′15″E

- IATA: none; ICAO: none

Summary
- Serves: Požarevac, SR Serbia, SFR Yugoslavia
- Interactive map of Požarevac Airfield

Požarevac Airfield (Serbian: Аеродром Пожаревац / Aerodrom Požarevac) was one of the oldest aerodromes in Serbia, opened in 1915 and closed in 1976. Požarevac Airfield was replaced with new Kostolac Airfield.

== See also ==
- List of airports in Serbia
