= Jagodina Airfield =

Airfield in Jagodina, Serbia

- IATA: none; ICAO: LYJA

Summary
- Airport type: Civil
- Location: Jagodina
- Elevation AMSL: 692 ft (211 m)
- Coordinates: 43°58′36″N 21°13′59″E

Map
- Location of Jagodina Airport

Runways
Direction	Length		Surface
Direction	ft	m	Surface
11/29	2,165	660	Grass

Jagodina Airfield is situated in the close vicinity of Jagodina, Serbia about 5 kilometres (3.1 mi), northwest of town centre.

It is used for sports and flight training for gliders and powered airplanes, as well as for skydiving.

The grass runway with length of 660 m (2,170 ft) and width of 60 m (200 ft) is used by ultralight, sport, business and agricultural aircraft weighing up to 5.7 tons. During 2012, the town of Jagodina invested about 3 million dinars from the city budget and donors in renovation of the airport.

With decision of the Directorate of Civil Aviation, from 8 March 2012, Jagodina was officially designed as sports airfield, the second of its kind in the Pomoravlje District, next to Paraćin Airfield.

After 60 years, Jagodina officially got the Barutana airfield at the Štiplje road, and now skydivers and pilots from the Aero Club Jagodina have their own airport.

The renovation and reconstruction of the airfield in 2012 was the largest investment since it was established in 1938. The work included relocation of the 500 meters (1,600 ft) of power lines, which was a condition for obtaining a license, as well as construction of the road and parking lot, and installation of the lighting from the main road to the hangar. The project also included the acquisition of the fuel tank, now owned by the Aero Club.

== History ==
The Jagodina Aero Club was formed in the year 1936 and started to work in 1938.

Though Jagodina has a seven-decade-long tradition of aviation, the local military and civilian airport was shut down in 1952, and the runway was converted into agricultural land. The large reconstruction project to re-establish the airport was launched in 2012.

Today, the Aero Club has 146 members, as modelers, parachutists and five licensed pilots. The club has two aircraft and two kites.

== Future plans ==
Future plans for the airfield include building a sport and business airport with occasional charter flights of the 80-seat planes. The plans include a paved runway of 1,300 by 30 meters (4,265 by 98 ft), with side grass strip, an administrative building, a modest control tower, two gas stations and apron. The cost of such expansion is estimated to cost between 1.2 and 1.5 million euros.

== See also ==
- List of airports in Serbia
