= Pančevo Airfield =

Airfield in Pančevo, Serbia

- IATA: none; ICAO: LYPA

Summary
- Airport type: Civil
- Serves: Pančevo, Serbia
- Elevation AMSL: 77 m (253 ft)
- Coordinates: 44°54′08″N 020°38′07″E

Map
- Location of the airport in Serbia

Runways
Direction	Length		Surface
Direction	m	ft	Surface
13L/31R	1,000	3,281	Grass

Pančevo Airfield (Serbian: Аеродром Панчево / Aerodrom Pančevo; (ICAO: LYPA)) is an aerodrome near the city of Pančevo, Serbia. It has a single grass runway 1,000 metres long and 60 metres wide.

The airfield is mostly used for general aviation operations as well as by Utva Aviation Industry, a manufacturer of light sporting and training aircraft also located in Pančevo, for testing its aircraft.

== History ==
On 15 March 1923, aircraft of the Franko-Rumen company started operations from Pančevo airfield. A few days later on 25 March, services between Paris and Istanbul via Pančevo commenced, the first international flights to or from Belgrade. On 9 September the same year, the first aircraft took off on a scheduled service from Belgrade to Bucharest. This was also the first commercial night flight in the history of aviation. CFRNA (Compagnie franco-roumaine de navigation aérienne) decided that flying at night was the only way for its aircraft operating on the Paris-Belgrade-Bucharest-Istanbul service to beat the famous Orient Express train to Istanbul.

Franco-Roumaine changed its name to CIDNA (Compagnie internationale de navigation aérienne) in 1925, which used Pančevo Airfield until May 1927.

== See also ==
- List of airports in Serbia
