= Leskovac Airfield =

Airfield in Leskovac, Serbia

- IATA: none; ICAO: LYLE

Summary
- Airport type: Public
- Owner: Civil Government
- Serves: Leskovac
- Location: Leskovac, Serbia
- Elevation AMSL: 738 ft (225 m)
- Coordinates: 43°01′07.43″N 21°56′02.26″E

Map
- Location within Serbia

Runways
Direction	Length		Surface
Direction	m	ft	Surface
18/36	1,100	3,609	Grass

Leskovac Airfield (Serbian: Аеродром Лесковац / Aerodrom Leskovac), (ICAO: LYLE), also known as Mira Airfield (Serbian: Аеродром Мира / Aerodrom Mira), is a recreational aerodrome in Serbia, located in the vicinity of the city of Leskovac (about 2.5 km north from the centre, near the road 158 that connects Leskovac–Niš). The airfield is mainly used for pilot training and sport parachuting jumping.

It is primarily used for sport, tourist and agronomic purposes although there are plans to expand the airfield into a small cargo airport, and then the small airport passenger characters.

== See also ==
- List of airports in Serbia
