= Jičín Airfield =

Jičín Airfield Letiště Jičín

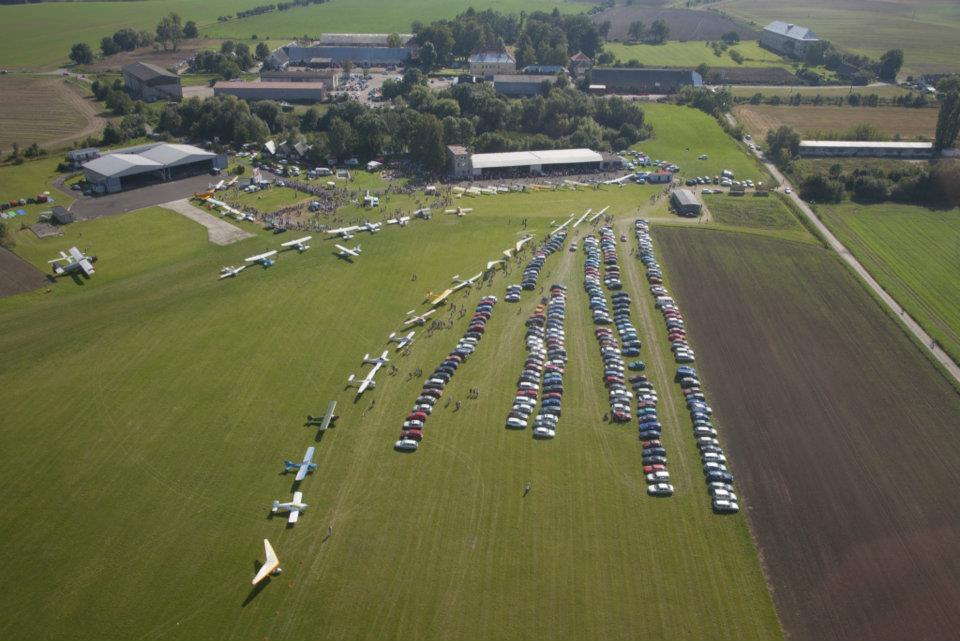
- IATA: none; ICAO: LKJC

Summary
- Airport type: Public
- Operator: Aeroklub Jičín o.s.
- Serves: Jičín
- Location: 1.8 kilometres (1.1 mi) SW from Jičín
- Opened: 1947
- Elevation AMSL: 863 ft / 263 m
- Coordinates: 50°25′48″N 015°19′59″E
- Website: www.letistejicin.cz

Map
- Location of the aerodrome in Czech Republic

Runways
| Direction | Length | | Surface |
| Direction | m | ft | Surface |
|---|---|---|---|
| 12/30 | 1,000 | 3,280 | Grass |

Jičín Airfield (Czech: Letiště Jičín) (ICAO: LKJC) is a public aerodrome with civil traffic. It is situated approximately 1.8 kilometres (1 mi) southwest of Jičín, a town in the Hradec Králové Region of the Czech Republic, at the border of Bohemian Paradise. The airfield is plentifully used for sports flying and sightseeing flights above Prachov Rocks eventually the Giant Mountains.

== Local Traffic Regulations and Restrictions ==
The airfield is designed for use by VFR flights in the day time and parachute jumping operation. Operational hours are 8:00-15:00 UTC in SAT, SUN, HOL from 15 April to 15 October. Outside operational hours arrivals are permitted only by prior arrangement with the airfield operator (check on a serviceability of movement areas). Arrivals of aircraft without two-way radio communication are possible only by previous agreement with the airfield operator.

=== Operational data ===
Traffic circuits: RWY 12 right hand / RWY 30 left hand
Traffic circuits altitude: 1900 ft/580m AMSL
Frequency: 118,080 MHz (Jičín RADIO)
