= Kraljevo Airfield =

Airfield in Kraljevo, Serbia

- IATA: none; ICAO: LYKA

Summary
- Airport type: Civil
- Serves: Kraljevo
- Location: Kraljevo, Serbia
- Elevation AMSL: 653 ft (199 m)
- Coordinates: 43°43′50.36″N 20°43′26.39″E

Map
- Location within Serbia

Runways
Direction	Length		Surface
Direction	ft	m	Surface
10/28	3,609	1,100	Grass

Kraljevo Airfield (Serbian: Аеродром Краљево / Aerodrom Kraljevo) (ICAO: LYKA), also known as Brege Airfield (Serbian: Аеродром Бреге / Aerodrom Brege), is a recreational aerodrome in Serbia, located in the vicinity of the city of Kraljevo (about 2.5 km southeast from the centre). It is used for sports and training flights for aircraft and gliders, parachuting jumps.

== See also ==
- List of airports in Serbia
