= Progar Airfield =

Airfield in Progar, Serbia

- IATA: none; ICAO: none

Summary
- Airport type: Civil
- Serves: Belgrade
- Location: Progar, Serbia
- Elevation AMSL: 227 ft (69 m)
- Coordinates: 44°43′22.65″N 20°10′50.87″E

Map
- Location within Serbia

Runways
Direction	Length		Surface
Direction	ft	m	Surface
12/30	2,297	700	Grass

Progar Airfield (Serbian: Аеродром Прогар / Aerodrom Progar) is an aerodrome in Serbia mostly used for agricultural purposes. The grass runway is located near the village of Progar, near the town Surčin, about 42 km southwest from the Belgrade city centre.

== See also ==
- List of airports in Serbia
