= Dubinje Air Base =

- IATA: none; ICAO: LYSJ

Summary
- Airport type: Military Air Base
- Owner: Ministry of Defence of Serbia
- Operator: Serbian Air Force and Air Defence
- Serves: Sjenica
- Location: Sjenica, Serbia
- Elevation AMSL: 3,314 ft (1,010 m)
- Coordinates: 43°16′28.20″N 20°03′00.96″E

Map
- Location within Serbia

Runways
Direction	Length		Surface
Direction	ft	m	Surface
13/31	8,202	2,500	Asphalt

Dubinje Airport (Serbian: Војни аеродром Дубиње / Vojni aerodrom Dubinje) is a military airbase near the town of Sjenica, Serbia.

== History ==
The airbase was used by Yugoslav Air Force. During the 1999 NATO bombing of Yugoslavia, it was damaged. In 2006, the Serbian Ministry of Defence announced that it would sell the land and premises, but this was never materialised. The management of Belgrade Nikola Tesla Airport have visited the air base that same year, and announced plans of making a project aimed at turning the air base into a public airport used for cargo.

== See also ==
- List of airports in Serbia

== Sources ==
- (in Serbian) Аеродром у Сјеници највећи изазов за деминере (Politika, 21.07.2019)
- (in Serbian) Najavljen je mogući predlog da se otkupi vojni Aerodrom u Sjenici, na tromesečni period tokom godine, kada bi služio u civilne svrhe za kargo prevoz, a u čijem okruženju bi se mogli izgraditi golf tereni, što bi, kako je rečeno, u predele skoro netaknute prirode, privuklo i strane turiste. (Danas, 29.10.2009)
- (in Serbian) Sjenica: Ostaje vojni aerodrom (FoNet, 24.09.2009)
- (in Serbian) Privreda Novog Pazara, koja tesno sarađuje sa Turskom, najavljivala je obnovu vojnog Aerodroma „Sjenica”, koji je takođe teško oštećen u bombardovanju. Vojska je voljna da proda taj aerodrom, ali kupaca i investitora i dalje nema. (Politika, 31.05.2009)
- (in Serbian) TUŽNA SUDBINA AERODROMA DUBINJE KOD SJENICE - Na pisti napasaju ovce
- (in Serbian) "Krtice" (Moles) - MiG-21s in bunker - Four MiG-21 and one G-4 Super Galeb buried in kamponir's at military airport Dubinje near Sjenica
- (in Serbian) U Sjenici spremni da kupe vojni aerodrom
- (in Bosnian) Aerodrom Sjenica - "Dubinje"
- (in Serbian) Poseta predstavnika JP Aerodrom "Nikola Tesla" Aerodromu u Sjenici
- (in Serbian) "Kontrola leta" (NIN)
