= Rosulje Airport =

- IATA: none; ICAO: LYKS

Summary
- Airport type: Public
- Owner: Government of Serbia
- Operator: Airports of Serbia
- Serves: Kruševac
- Location: Kruševac, Serbia
- Elevation AMSL: 541 ft (165 m)
- Coordinates: 43°33′40″N 21°22′58″E
- Website: rosulje.aerodromisrbije.rs

Map
- Location within Serbia

Runways
Direction	Length		Surface
Direction	ft	m	Surface
02/20	3,281	1,000	Asphalt

Airports of Serbia
- Native name: Аеродроми Србије
- Romanized name: Aerodromi Srbije
- Type: Limited liability company
- Industry: Aviation
- Founded: 2 February 2016; 10 years ago
- Founder: Government of Serbia
- Headquarters: Vazduhoplovaca 24, Niš, Serbia
- Key people: Mihajlo Zdravković (Director)
- Services: Airport management
- Revenue: €4.21 million (2020) ▲
- Net income: €1.16 million (2020) ▲
- Total assets: €96.30 million (2020) ▲
- Total equity: €91.62 million (2020) ▲
- Owner: Government of Serbia (100%)
- Number of employees: 200 (2020)
- Subsidiaries: Aerodrom Trebinje d.o.o. (Bosnia and Herzegovina)
- Website: www.aerodromisrbije.rs
- Footnotes; Business ID: 07343914; Tax ID: 101531405

Rosulje Airport (Serbian: Аеродром Росуље / Aerodrom Rosulje) (ICAO: LYKS) is an airport two kilometres (1.2 mi) south from the city of Kruševac, Serbia. The airport is located on the Jasikovica plateau and with plans for domestic air traffic and the possibility of becoming international airport, if the need arises.

== History ==
After the transfer of shares and founding rights to the public company Airports of Serbia in 2020, it is foreseen as an airport that can be included in the network of regional offers.

== See also ==
- List of airports in Serbia
