= Kikinda Airfield =

Airfield in Kikinda, Serbia

Kikinda Airfield Drahslerov Salaš Airfield
- IATA: none; ICAO: LYKI

Summary
- Airport type: Civil
- Location: Kikinda
- Elevation AMSL: 266 ft (81 m)
- Coordinates: 45°46′01″N 20°25′11″E

Map
- Location within Serbia

Runways
Direction	Length		Surface
Direction	ft	m	Surface
14/32	2,953	900	Grass

Kikinda Airfield (Serbian: Aerodrom Kikinda or Aerodrom Drahslerov Salaš, Аеродром Кикинда or Аеродром Драxслеров Салаш) is a recreational airfield in Serbia, situated in the vicinity of the northern town of Kikinda. (9 kilometres south-west from the town centre), close to the Subotica-Novi Sad route.

It is used mainly for sports flights of aircraft, gliders; helicopter flights and parachute jumps.

== See also ==
- List of airports in Serbia
