= Knjaževac Airfield =

Former airfield in Knjaževac, Serbia

Knjaževac Airfield Aerodrom Knjaževac
- IATA: none; ICAO: none

Summary
- Airport type: Defunct
- Operator: Government of Serbia
- Location: Knjaževac
- Elevation AMSL: 656 ft (200 m)
- Coordinates: 43°41′22.49″N 22°17′46.57″E

Map
- Location within Serbia

Runways
Direction	Length		Surface
Direction	ft	m	Surface
02/20	3,806	1,160	Grass

Knjaževac Airfield (in use 1989–1996) was situated north of Knjaževac, 500 m north of the village of Minićevo, on the right side of the Knjaževac-Zaječar road and railway.

== History ==
The airfield was opened on 19 September 1989 and it was designed for sport flights airplanes, gliders and parachuting jumps, and especially for ultra light aircraft. The surrounding area is very attractive because of the clean nature, it had a large potential for aero tourism in the Knjaževac municipality. The two pilot zones "Mali izvor" and "Debelica" were near the airport.

Flights were controlled from Niš Constantine the Great Airport. The airfield was closed in 1996, when the local government returned the land to previous owners in an attempt to stop the growing displeasure about the situation in the country. What remains of the airport is an old hangar which is not in use anymore and the aircraft that was used at the airport, PZL-104 Wilga 35A, which stands like a monument to a forgotten era of Yugoslavian aviation. The aircraft has not been flown since 1996, and since the airfield was destroyed in a matter of hours, it was unable to fly to the nearest working airport. During the years it was torn apart by thieves and all that remains now is a shell of a dead plane.

== See also ==
- List of airports in Serbia
