= Livno Airfield =

Livno Airfield Aerodrom Livno
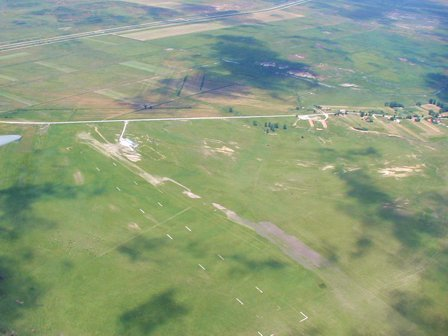
- IATA: none; ICAO: LQLV

Summary
- Airport type: Public
- Operator: Bosnia and Herzegovina Directorate of Civil Aviation (BHDCA)
- Serves: Livno, Bosnia and Herzegovina
- Location: Livno, Bosnia and Herzegovina
- Coordinates: 43°47′35″N 016°54′25″E
- Interactive map of Livno Airfield

Runways
Direction	Length		Surface
Direction	ft	m	Surface
05/23		1,100	Grass
02/20		600	Grass
13L/31R		850	Asphalt(?)
13R/31L		750	Grass

Livno Airfield is a recreational aerodrome situated in the municipality of Livno in Bosnia and Herzegovina, at the south-east side of Livanjsko field, about 10 kilometers away from the town of Livno. It is a small airfield for aircraft up to 5700 kg Maximum Takeoff Weight. It has four grass runways which are 850, 750, 1100 and 600 meters in length. It served as a Partisan airfield during World War II.
