= Smederevska Palanka Airfield =

Airfield in Smederevska Palanka, Serbia

Smederevska Palanka Airfield Rudine Airfield
- IATA: none; ICAO: LYSP

Summary
- Airport type: Public
- Serves: Smederevska Palanka
- Location: Smederevska Palanka, Serbia
- Elevation AMSL: 325 ft (99 m)
- Coordinates: 44°20′59.81″N 20°57′34.67″E

Map
- Location within Serbia

Runways
Direction	Length		Surface
Direction	ft	m	Surface
12/30	2,297	700	Grass

Smederevska Palanka Airfield (Serbian: Аеродром Смедеревска Паланка / Aerodrom Smederevska Palanka) (ICAO: LYSP), also locally known as Rudine Airfield (Serbian: Аеродром Рудине / Aerodrom Rudine), is a recreational aerodrome that serves the town of Smederevska Palanka. The airfield has a grass runway that is 700 m long and 30 m wide.

== See also ==
- List of airports in Serbia
