= Ceadîr-Lunga Airport =

Defunct airport in Ceadîr-Lunga, Moldova

- IATA: none; ICAO: LUCL

Summary
- Airport type: Defunct
- Location: Ceadîr-Lunga, Moldova
- Elevation AMSL: 587 ft (179 m)
- Coordinates: 46°02′05.98″N 028°51′06.64″E
- Interactive map of Ceadîr-Lunga Airport

Runways
Direction	Length		Surface
Direction	ft	m	Surface
02/20	6,463	1,970	Grass

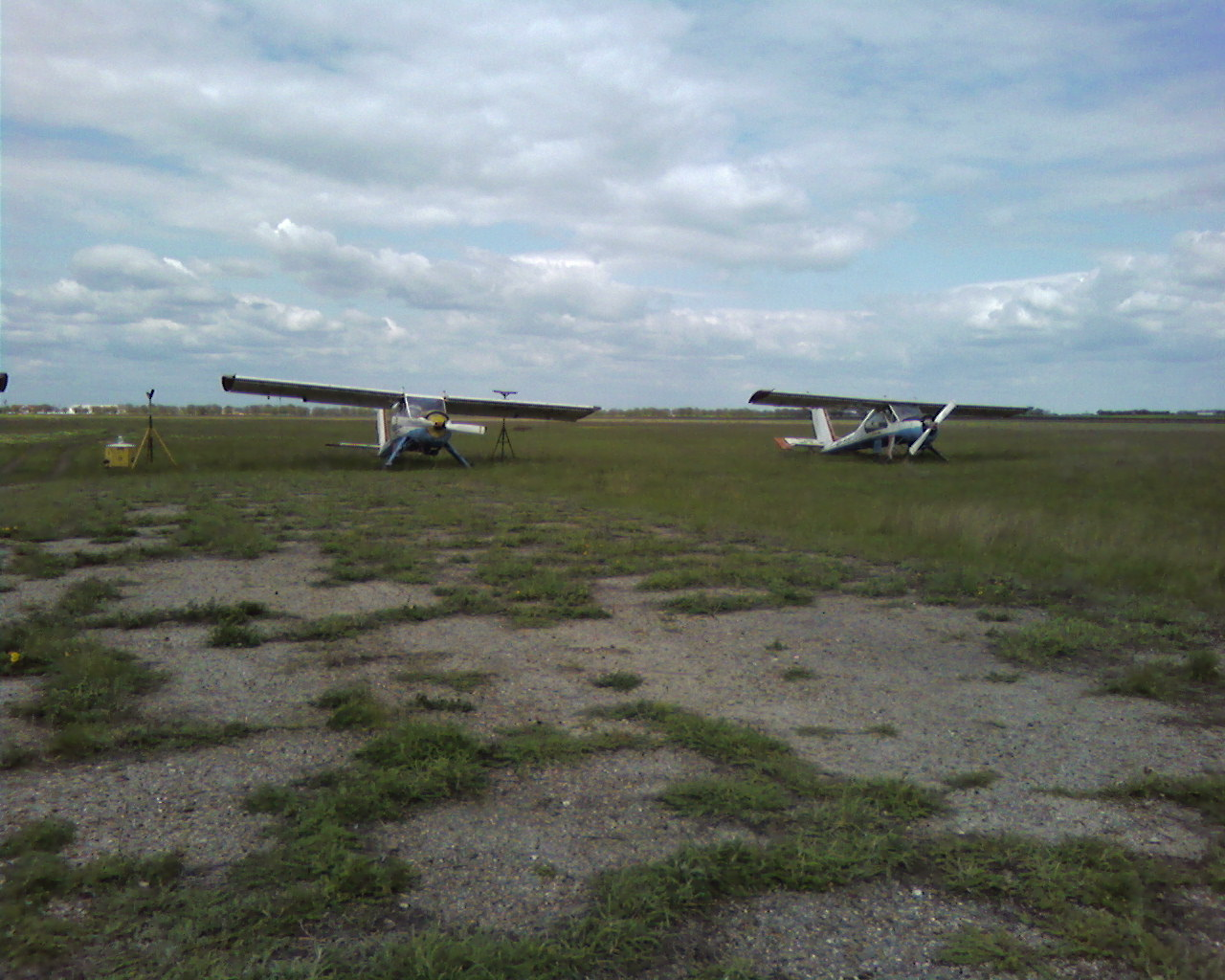

Ceadîr-Lunga Airport (ICAO: LUCL) is located in Ceadîr-Lunga, Gagauzia, Moldova, 3 km (1.85 mi) south-east of the city centre.

== History ==
The airport was used in the 1960s by Soviet Antonov AN-2 aircraft, which use to fly regular flights to Chișinău in Moldova, Tiraspol in Transnistria, and Odesa in Ukraine. Today, the airport is disused, and there are abandoned aircraft left behind.
