= Zrenjanin Airfield =

Airfield in Zrenjanin, Serbia

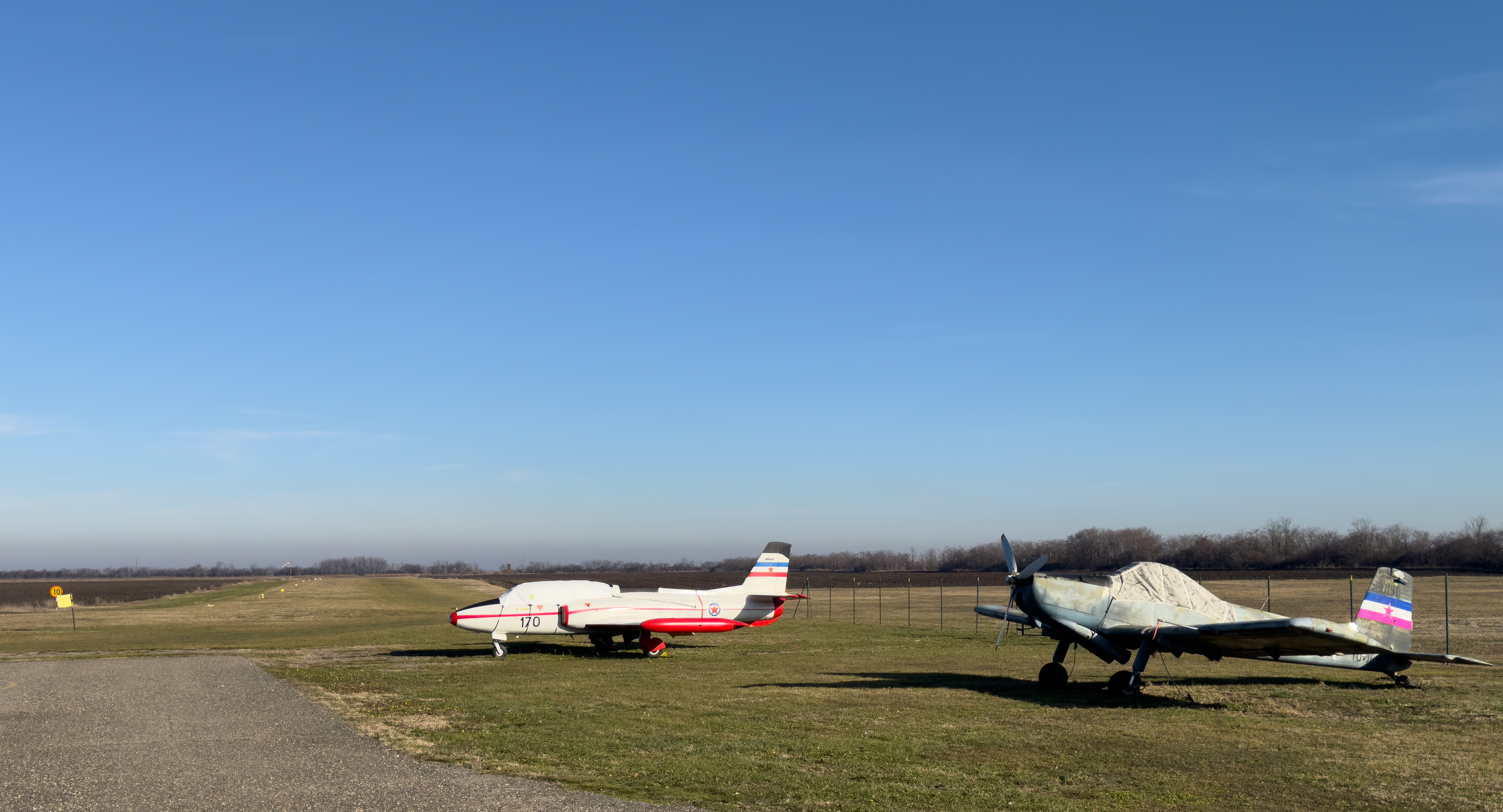
- IATA: none; ICAO: LYZR

Summary
- Airport type: Public
- Operator: Government of Serbia
- Location: Zrenjanin
- Elevation AMSL: 246 ft (75 m)
- Coordinates: 45°20′23.12″N 20°27′14.68″E

Map
- Location within Serbia

Runways
Direction	Length		Surface
Direction	ft	m	Surface
15/33	3,937	1,200	Grass

Zrenjanin Airfield (Serbian: Аеродром 3peњaнин / Aerodrom Zrenjanin) (ICAO: LYZR), also known as Ečka Airfield (Serbian: Аеродром Ечка / Aerodrom Ečka), is a recreational aerodrome in the Zrenjanin, Serbia.

== History ==
The Germans used a concrete runway when building the airfield (1,800 metres long and 50 metres wide, the longest in the world at the time) in 1942 in Bagljaš during the occupation of the Banat region. The field was used by Luftwaffe pilots to carry out military attacks on Serbia during World War II. After the war, the region and the airport were handed back to the Serbs. The concrete runway was destroyed by the Yugoslav People's Army in 1948 at the beginning of the Informbiro crisis. The remains of the runway are still visible.

In 1977, it was replaced by current aerodrome which is used for sports and trade usage as well as used for pilot training.

There is ongoing project of airport reconstruction. The first phase encompasses the building of the control tower, hangar, terminal, aircraft parking area and other essentials. The Zrenjanin City Council is currently arranging for the required 650,000 euros that is needed to finance the construction and give the Ečka Airport the International Airport status. The airfield will be able to host 20 aircraft at any given time.

In 2007, Zrenjanin Aerodrome gained a license to transport passenger and cargo traffic from the Civil Air Traffic Directorate.

The second phase of the project is a reconstruction of the old German concrete runway parallel to the grass runway. The completion of Phase 2, which is estimated to cost 3 million euros, will enable passenger and cargo aircraft to land and take off.

In 2008, Austrian company Vizium Air (the general representative of Diamond Aircraft, the largest sports aircraft producer in Europe), signed an agreement with the City Council of Zrenjanin that includes the construction of facilities for sports aircraft plant (opening of two production facilities), a service centre and a flying school in Zrenjanin with reconstruction of concrete runway, which would employ 400 people.

The Austrian company has announced recently that it intended to buy another 15 hectares of land close to the aerodrome, and would invest 30 million euros in the development of the aircraft industry in Serbia. However, in early December 2009, Vizium Air announced that the agreement has been mutually cancelled by the company and the town's administration, since it was "designed in such a way that realization would be impossible".

== See also ==
- List of airports in Serbia

== Sources ==
- (in Serbian) „Arheološko” svedočanstvo o zrenjaninskoj avijaciji (Politika, 01.10.2008)
- (in Serbian) U rušenju hangara pronađena povelja iz 1929. godine (Radio-televizija Vojvodine, 30.09.2008)
- (in Serbian) Zrenjaninci prave male avione za Evropu (Blic, 27.08.2008)
- "Aerodrom Ečka dobio dozvolu za saobraćaj". Press (in Serbian). Beta. 2007-05-07. Archived from the original on 2012-03-15. "Zrenjaninski aerodrom "Ečka" dobio je dozvolu za putnički i teretni saobraćaj od Direktorata za civilno vazudhoplovstvo, izjavio je danas marketing menadžer tog aerodroma Lazar Erne"
- Zrenjanin airport information (PDF)
- (in Serbian) Vojvođani dobijaju prvi aerodrom?
- (in Serbian) 10 maja na aerodromu Ečka kod Zrenjanina održaće se prezentacija Cessna aviona (Cessna 182, Cessna 206, Cessna Caravan) sa početkom u 10:00 časova
- "SkyLark" - Ultra-Light Airplane* (Canadian-Czech "DOVA Aircraft" company presentation at Zrenjanin Airport - May 10, 2007)
