= Trstenik Airfield =

Airfield in Trstenik, Serbia

- IATA: none; ICAO: LYTR

Summary
- Airport type: Public
- Operator: Civil government
- Location: Trstenik
- Elevation AMSL: 525 ft (160 m)
- Coordinates: 43°36′51.08″N 021°01′48.78″E

Map
- Location in Serbia

Runways
Direction	Length		Surface
Direction	ft	m	Surface
11/29	6,234	1,900	Concrete/grass

Trstenik Airfield (ICAO: LYTR) (Serbian: Аеродром Трстеник, Latin: Aerodrom Trstenik) is a recreational aerodrome near the town of Trstenik, Serbia.

The grass runway is 80 meters (260 feet) wide with concrete runway beginnings on both thresholds 30 meters (98 feet) in width and 300 meters (980 feet) in length.

In 1990, a new control tower and underground fuel tanks were built.

== History ==
On 4 July 1965, Jat Airways, then known as JAT Yugoslav Airlines, opened a route between Belgrade and spa resort Vrnjačka Banja with a Douglas DC-3 aircraft.

== See also ==
- List of airports in Serbia
