= Lisičji Jarak Airfield =

Airfield in Padinska Skela, Serbia

- IATA: none; ICAO: LYBJ

Summary
- Airport type: Public
- Operator: Civil government
- Serves: Belgrade
- Location: Padinska Skela, Serbia
- Elevation AMSL: 214 ft (65 m)
- Coordinates: 44°56′13.05″N 20°26′33.20″E

Map
- Location within Serbia

Runways
Direction	Length		Surface
Direction	ft	m	Surface
15/33	3,281	1,000	Grass

Lisičji Jarak Airfield (Serbian: Аеродром Лисичји Јарак / Aerodrom Lisičji Jarak) (ICAO: LYBJ) is located 13 km north from the city of Belgrade, near Padinska Skela, Serbia. The aerodrome is mostly used for pilot training and sport parachuting jumps, as well as crop dusting operations.

== See also ==
- List of airports in Serbia
