= Bubovice =

- Municipality
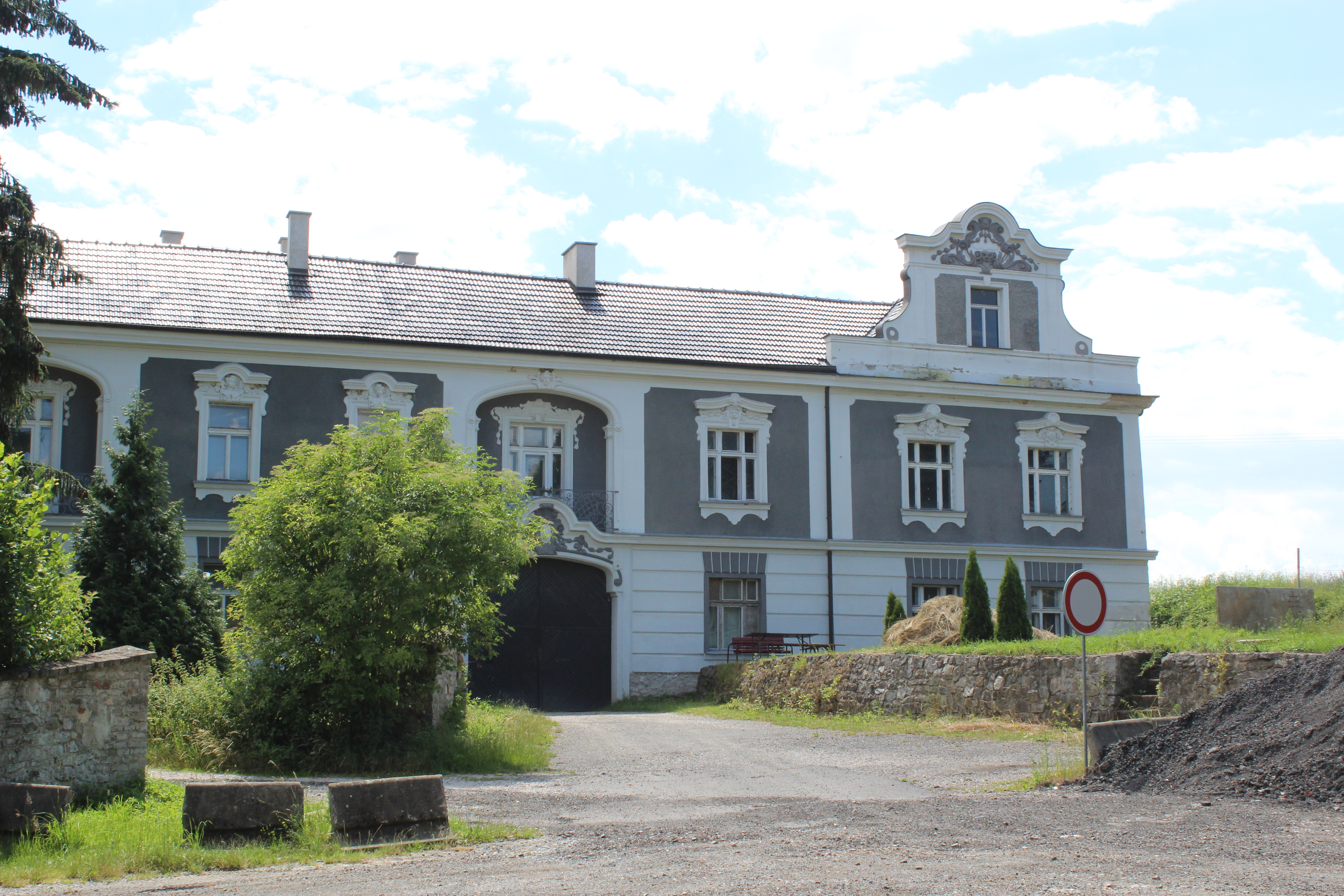
- Château in the centre of Bubovice

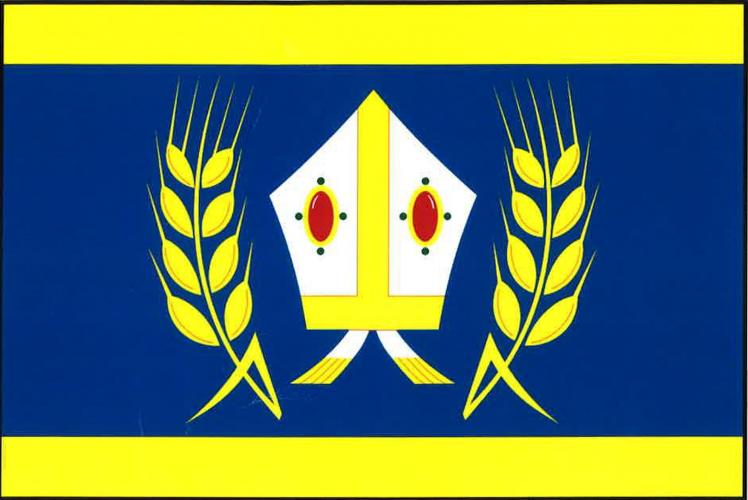
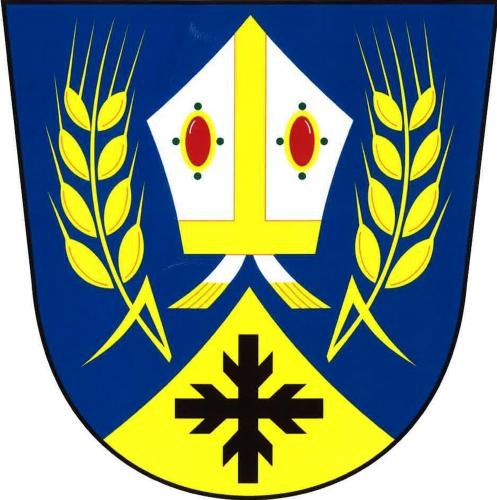
- Flag Coat of arms

- Location in the Czech Republic
- Coordinates: 49°58′11″N 14°10′0″E
- Country: Czech Republic
- Region: Central Bohemian
- District: Beroun
- First mentioned: 1333

Area
  - Total: 4.10 km^{2} (1.58 sq mi)
- Elevation: 375 m (1,230 ft)

Population (2026-01-01)
  - Total: 578
  - Density: 141/km^{2} (365/sq mi)
- Time zone: UTC+1 (CET)
  - Summer (DST): UTC+2 (CEST)
- Postal code: 267 18
- Website: www.bubovice.cz

Bubovice is a municipality and village in Beroun District in the Central Bohemian Region of the Czech Republic. It has about 600 inhabitants.

== Demographics ==
Historical population
Year	Pop.	±%
1869	299	—
1880	328	+9.7%
1890	325	−0.9%
1900	337	+3.7%
1910	381	+13.1%
1921	383	+0.5%
1930	404	+5.5%
1950	303	−25.0%
1961	318	+5.0%
1970	279	−12.3%
1980	265	−5.0%
1991	213	−19.6%
2001	241	+13.1%
2011	401	+66.4%
2021	628	+56.6%
Source: Censuses
