= Zemun Polje Airfield =

Airfield in Belgrade, Serbia

Zemun Polje 13th of May Airfield
- IATA: none; ICAO: none

Summary
- Airport type: Public
- Operator: Civil Government
- Location: Zemun
- Elevation AMSL: 243 ft (74 m)
- Coordinates: 44°52′35.05″N 20°18′17.80″E

Map
- Location within Serbia

Runways
| Direction | Length | | Surface |
| Direction | ft | m | Surface |
|---|---|---|---|
| 13/31 | 2,133 | 650 | Grass |

The Zemun Polje 13th of May Airfield(Serbian: Аеродром Земун Поље - 13. Мај or Aerodrom Zemun Polje - 13. Maj) is located on left side of the Belgrade-Novi Sad road, parallel to the railway for about 500–600 m before road turns towards Batajnica. It mostly sports- and amateur aeroplanes.

== See also ==
- List of airports in Serbia
