= Sremska Mitrovica Airfield =

Airfield in Sremska Mitrovica, Serbia

Sremska Mitrovica Airfield Veliki Radinci Airfield
- IATA: none; ICAO: LYSM

Summary
- Airport type: Civil
- Operator: Flight Club "Sremska Mitrovica"
- Serves: Sremska Mitrovica
- Location: Veliki Radinci
- Elevation AMSL: 325 ft (99 m)
- Coordinates: 45°02′15″N 19°39′45″E

Map
- Location within Serbia

Runways
Direction	Length		Surface
Direction	ft	m	Surface
09/27	3,625	1,105	Grass

Sremska Mitrovica Airfield (Serbian: Аеродром Сремска Митровица / Aerodrom Sremska Mitrovica) (ICAO: LYSM) is an aerodrome near the town of Sremska Mitrovica, Serbia. The airport is also known as Veliki Radinci Airfield (Serbian: Аеродром Велики Радинци / Aerodrom Veliki Radinci).

The airfield is operated by Flight Club "Sremska Mitrovica". Main operations at the airfield are soaring, gliding and sport, general and ultralight flying. It is the only operating TOST winch which is used for gliding operations all around the year giving all interested pilots opportunity to fly at low cost.

Flight club is investing in infrastructure around the airport to give better conditions for visiting pilots. Housing and ground entertainment is under construction.

== See also ==
- List of airports in Serbia
