= Senica Airport =

Senica Airport Letisko Senica
- IATA: none; ICAO: LZSE

Summary
- Airport type: Private
- Operator: Záhorácky Aeroklub Senica
- Location: Senica
- Elevation AMSL: 617 ft / 188 m
- Coordinates: 48°39′28″N 17°19′47″E
- Interactive map of Senica Airport

Runways
Direction	Length		Surface
Direction	m	ft	Surface
12L/30R	1,080	3,542	Asphalt
12R/30L	1,080	3,542	Grass

Senica Airport (ICAO: LZSE) is a private airport near the city of Senica in western Slovakia. The airport is operated by Záhorácky Aeroklub Senica.

== Airlines and destinations ==
As of 20 June 2024, there are no scheduled passenger services to/from Senica Airport. The airport, built by club members, opened on 8 May 1973 but was not fully completed until 1974. From the beginning it was used for sporting purposes, so a regular service was never built.
