= Čačak Airfield =

Airfield in Čačak, Serbia

Čačak Airfield Ravan Airfield
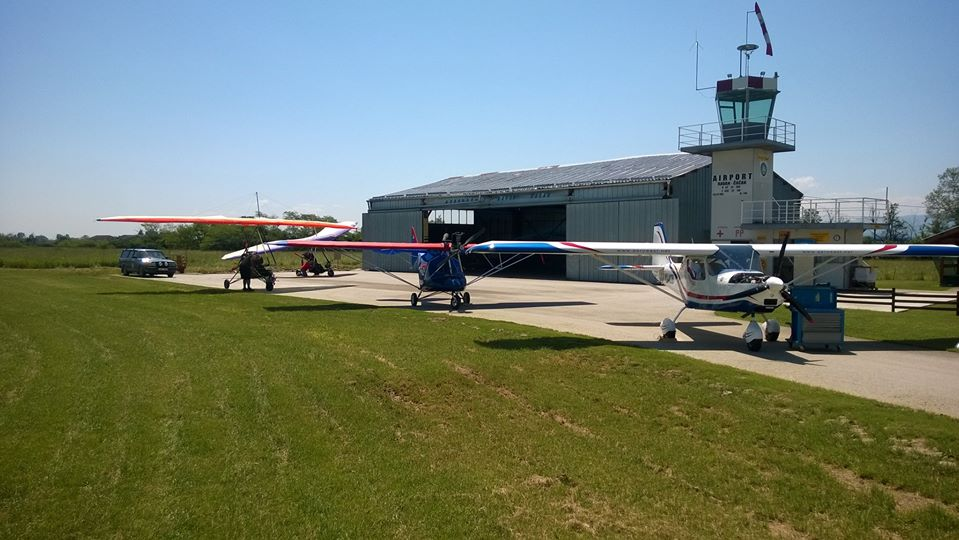
- IATA: none; ICAO: LYCA

Summary
- Airport type: Civil
- Serves: Čačak
- Location: Čačak, Serbia
- Elevation AMSL: 236 m (774 ft)
- Coordinates: 43°53′54″N 020°26′04″E

Map
- Location of the airport in Serbia

Runways
Direction	Length		Surface
Direction	m	ft	Surface
12L/30R	600	1,969	Grass
12R/30L	220	722	Asphalt

Čačak Airfield (Serbian: Аеродром Чачак / Aerodrom Čačak) (ICAO: LYCA), also known as Ravan Airfield (Serbian: Аеродром Раван / Aerodrom Ravan), is a recreational aerodrome situated in the vicinity of the hippodrome in Čačak, Serbia. Ravan is a sports airfield A1 class. The field boasts a runway measuring 600 x 60 metres, a club house, and a hangar for storing techniques, as well as a 16-metre-high air traffic control tower. Aero Club Čačak one operated from this field, and today it is home to Čačanski Aero Club Finesse, a center for pilot training on light motor airplanes and motorgliders. Every year, the local Aero Meeting takes place here.

The aerodrome is located 6 kilometres (3.7 mi) northeast of the city of Čačak, in the village of Preljina.

== See also ==
- List of airports in Serbia
