= Bor Airfield =

Bor Airfield Аеродром Бор
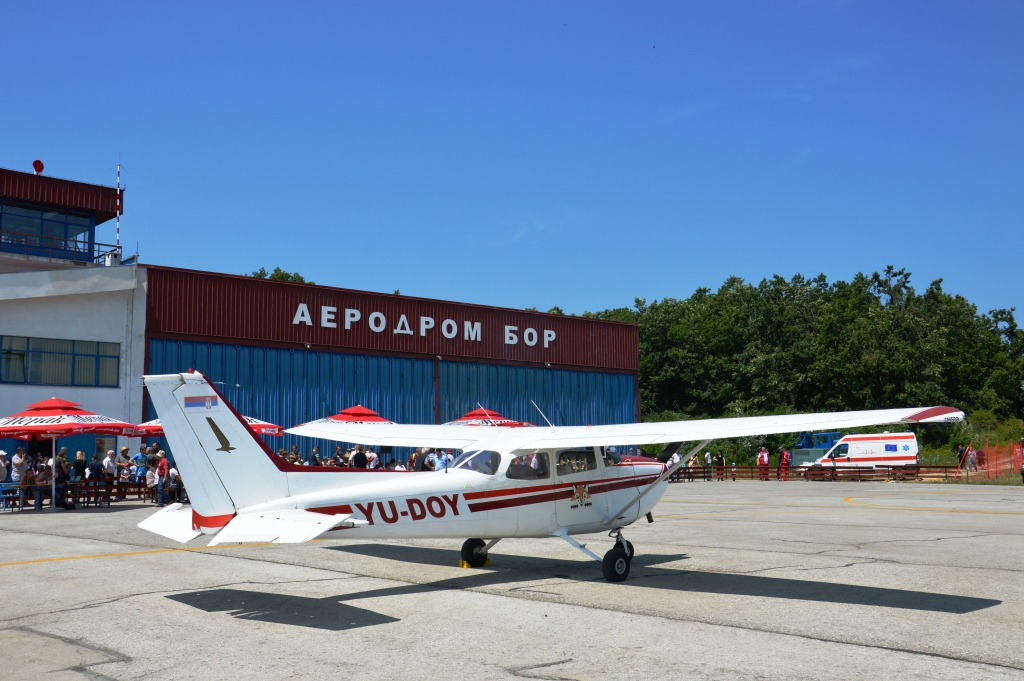
- IATA: none; ICAO: LYBO

Summary
- Airport type: Public
- Owner: Government of Serbia
- Operator: Airports of Serbia
- Serves: Bor
- Location: Bor, Serbia
- Elevation AMSL: 1,266 ft (386 m)
- Coordinates: 44°01′5.65″N 22°08′13.69″E

Map
- Location in Serbia

Runways
Direction	Length		Surface
Direction	ft	m	Surface
15/33	3,562	1,086	Asphalt

Airports of Serbia
- Native name: Аеродроми Србије
- Romanized name: Aerodromi Srbije
- Type: Limited liability company
- Industry: Aviation
- Founded: 2 February 2016; 10 years ago
- Founder: Government of Serbia
- Headquarters: Vazduhoplovaca 24, Niš, Serbia
- Key people: Mihajlo Zdravković (Director)
- Services: Airport management
- Revenue: €4.21 million (2020) ▲
- Net income: €1.16 million (2020) ▲
- Total assets: €96.30 million (2020) ▲
- Total equity: €91.62 million (2020) ▲
- Owner: Government of Serbia (100%)
- Number of employees: 200 (2020)
- Subsidiaries: Aerodrom Trebinje d.o.o. (Bosnia and Herzegovina)
- Website: www.aerodromisrbije.rs
- Footnotes; Business ID: 07343914; Tax ID: 101531405

Bor Airfield (Serbian: Аеродром Бор, romanized: Aerodrom Bor) (ICAO: LYBO) is an aerodrome located in east part of Serbia near the city of Bor, Serbia and around 26 km (16 mi) from the city of Zaječar, Serbia. The aerodrome is also located near the mountain resort Crni Vrh (Black Peak, 1,043 m (3,422 ft) high) and many other tourist attractions like Brestovac Spa, the Stol mountain, Lazar's cave, Lazar's Canyon, Vratna Gates, Bor Zoo and the Gornjak monastery.

The airfield was built from 1984 to 1986. It is used for sports.

The airfield can handle light commercial and business planes at the moment. Initially it was built with 800 m (2,600 ft) of runway, but it was subsequently extended and now has over 1,000 m (3,300 ft) of concrete runway, 30 m (98 ft) wide. It remains one of the best small civil airports in Serbia. Airport has hangar, control tower, a saloon and accommodation for the crew members. In 2011 the new Aero klub Bor was founded, and there is now an effort to build a general aviation maintenance center and obtain light airplane for training and parachuting. The airfield was operated by Aero klub Bor (Bor Aero Club) and Bor Sports Center. Sections of the Aero club include skydiving, parachuting, and training for pilots.

The club used to have one airplane Utva 75 and a few parachutists. The airplane crashed at Paracin airport in 1988. and was repaired, but it had another accident Bor airport in 1990. Later it was sent for maintenance to the factory in Pancevo, and later based in Batajnica.

In 1992 for a short period of time the airfield was base for squadron of J-21 from Skopje Airport. Two Antonov An-26 were stationed in 1999. during the NATO bombing of Yugoslavia from Niš Constantine the Great Airport.

== Reconstruction and development ==
Bor Airfield has been reconstructed and is now able to accept passenger aircraft. Bor Airport has a good runway, modern control tower and hangars.

Since 2012 Bor Airfield is permitted for handling of light/medium aircraft, recreational and training flights. In 2012, the first aircraft, a Cessna 172, landed at the airfield, being the first aeroplane after a 15-year hiatus.

Bor plans to improve their facilities, especially on approach lights for night operation. Meanwhile, many business delegations used Bor Airport for landing.

=== Ownership ===
In 2020, it was announced that airfield will change ownership to state owned, instead of being owned by the City of Bor. Airport operator was changed to Public Company Airports of Serbia and relocation of the airfield was announced in the next 10 to 15 years. Plan was to use the current location for mining and the new airport runway would be counteracted at a new location, with better or similar characteristics. Later was announced that the airfield will not be relocated from its current location because the mining activities that are being carried out not far from it do not affect the airfield operations."Bor airport changing ownership".

== See also ==
- List of airports in Serbia
