= Sombor Air Base =

- IATA: none; ICAO: LYSO

Summary
- Airport type: Military air base
- Owner: Ministry of Defence of Serbia
- Operator: Serbian Air Force and Air Defence
- Serves: Sombor
- Location: Sombor, Serbia
- Elevation AMSL: 272 ft (83 m)
- Coordinates: 45°43′19.98″N 19°03′29.37″E

Map
- Location within Serbia

Runways
Direction	Length		Surface
Direction	ft	m	Surface
14/32	5,905	1,800	Concrete
14/32	5,250	1,600	Grass

Sombor Air Base (Serbian: Војни аеродром Сомбор / Vojni aerodrom Sombor); ICAO: LYSO) is military air base near the city of Sombor, Serbia.

== History ==
The Germans built the airport in 1944 (1,200 meters long and 60 meters wide concrete runway) during the Axis occupation of the Bačka region.

During the NATO bombing of Yugoslavia in 1999, the air base was badly damaged.

A consortium of airport owners from Italy, led by a councillor in the government of Italy, Adel Bertolini, spoke in Apatin with the management of that municipality about the possibility of adaptation of the existing military airbaseinto a centre for cargo and passenger transportation. On the suggestion of the mayor of the municipality of Apatin, Živorad Smiljanić, it was agreed that the representatives of the Italian consortium should send the letter of intent in which they should define the conditions for design of feasibility study and the name of the potential investor. The Serbian Ministry of Defence of Serbia must first give consent for turning a military air base into a civilian one. Also, delegation of FlyBalaton Airport, which is owner of two airports in Hungary, was interested in turning the air base into a civil airport, in cooperation with the biggest low-cost airline, Ryanair.

== See also ==
- List of airports in Serbia
