= List of airports in Serbia =

This is the list of airports in Serbia, grouped by type and sorted by location.

== Passenger statistics ==
Rank	Airport	City	IATA / ICAO	2021	2022	2023	2024	2025	Change
1	Belgrade Nikola Tesla Airport	Belgrade	BEG / LYBE	3,285,295	5,611,729	7,948,202	8,364,358	8,912,349	▲6.5%
2	Niš Constantine the Great Airport	Niš	INI / LYNI	146,296	389,022	448,312	357,313	393,102	▲10%
3	Morava Airport	Kraljevo	KVO / LYKV	1,488	13,683	13,862	13,781	14,713	▲6.8%
Total				3,433,079	6,014,435	8,410,376	8,735,452	9,320,164	▲6.7%

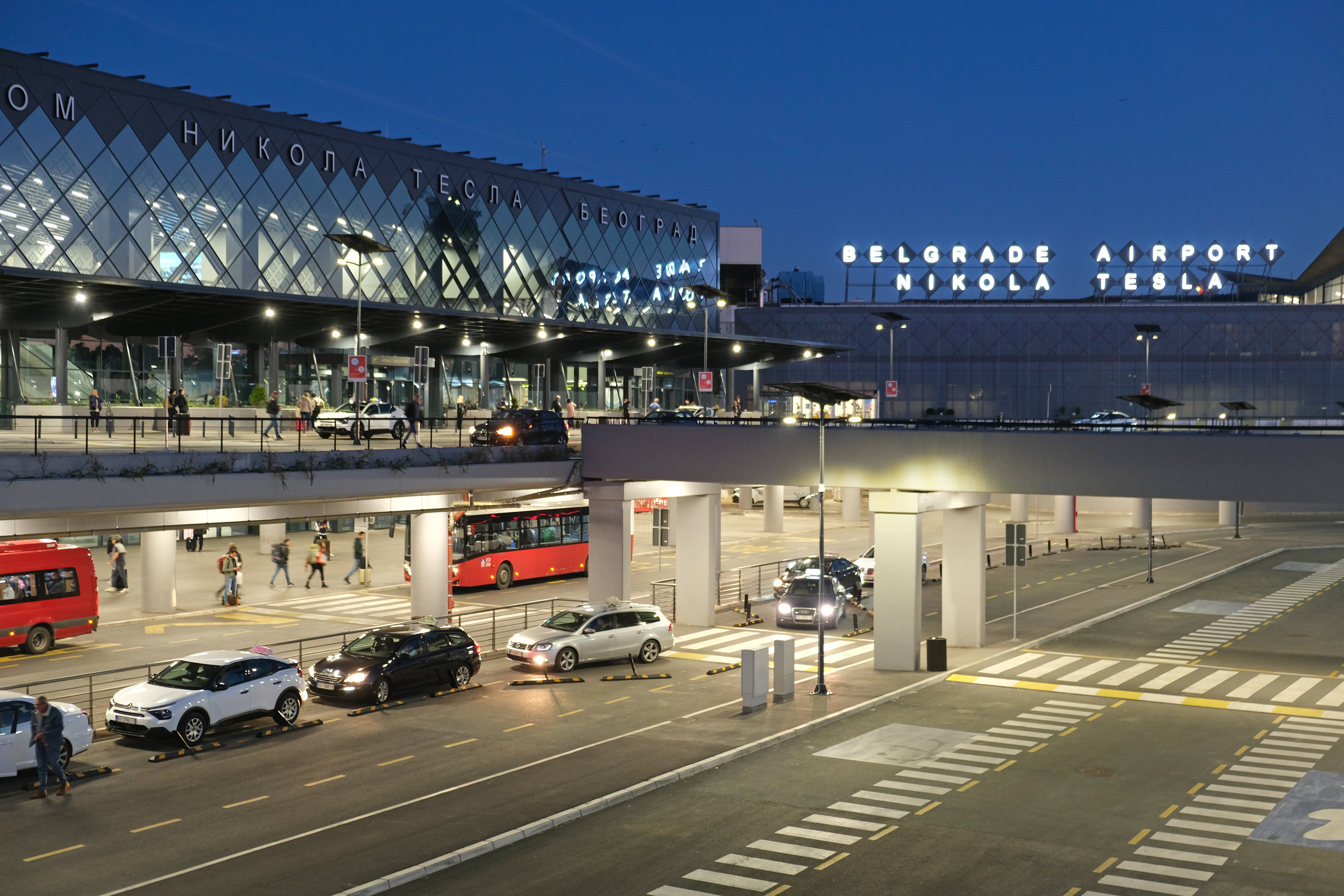
Belgrade Nikola Tesla Airport

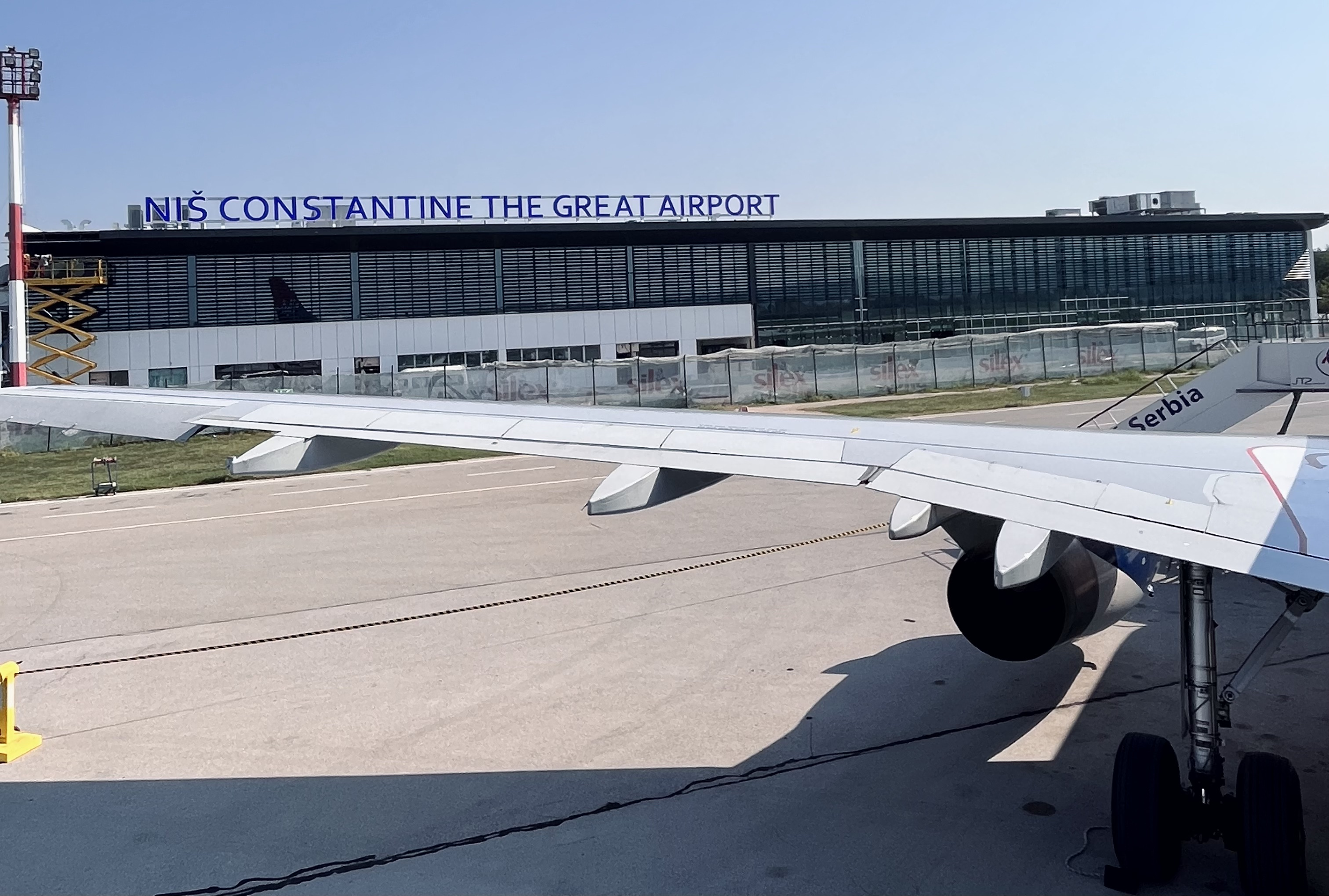
Niš Constantine the Great Airport

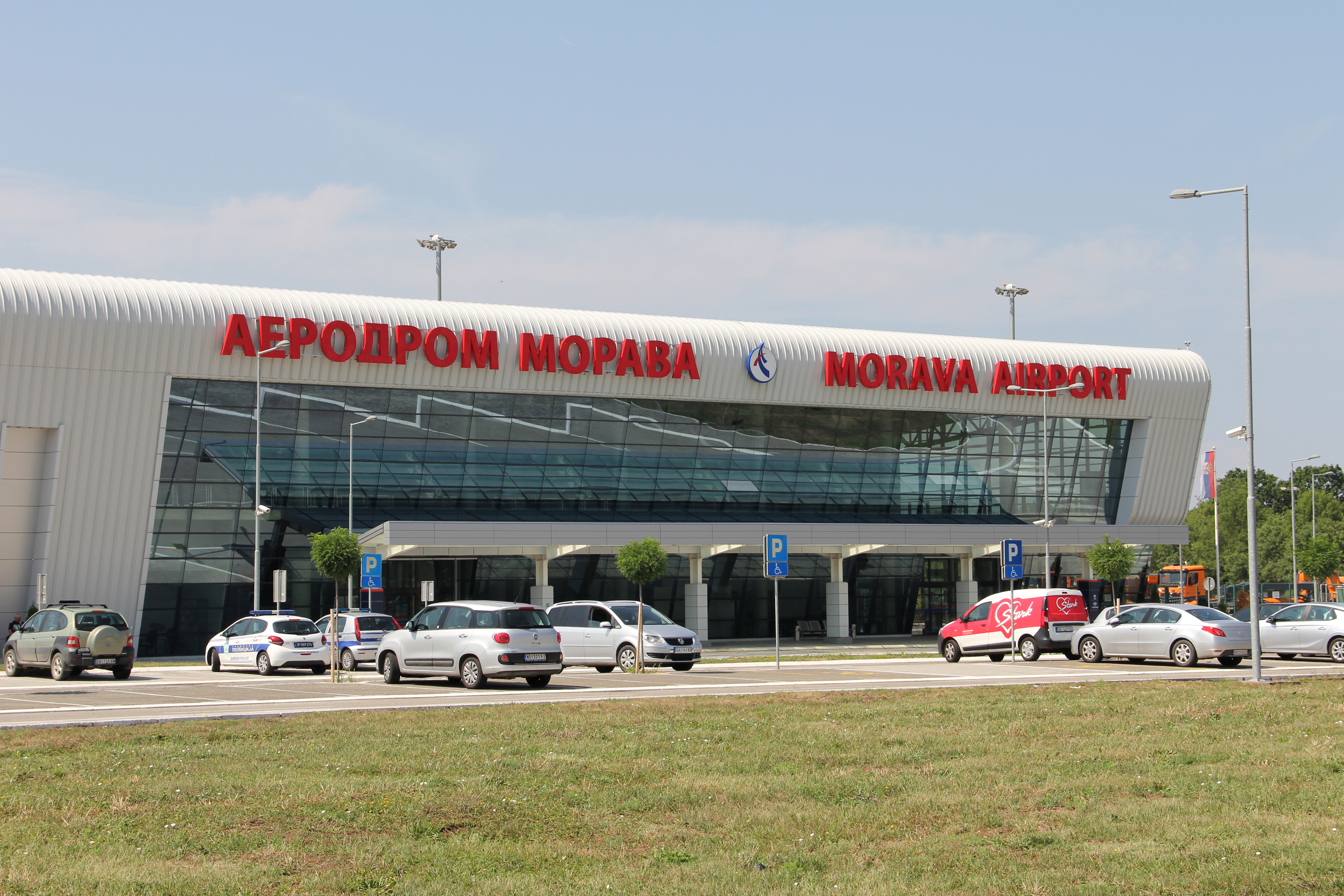
Morava Airport

== List ==
City or town	ICAO	IATA	Name	Runway
International airports
Belgrade	LYBE	BEG	Belgrade Nikola Tesla Airport	Asphalt/concrete
Kraljevo	LYKV	KVO	Morava Airport	Asphalt
Niš	LYNI	INI	Niš Constantine the Great Airport	Asphalt
Minor airports
Kruševac	LYKS		Rosulje Airport	Asphalt
Užice	LYUZ	UZC	Ponikve Airport	Asphalt/concrete
Military air bases
Belgrade	LYBT	BJY	Batajnica Air Base	Asphalt
Kraljevo	LYKV	KVO	Lađevci Air Base	Asphalt
Niš	LYNI	INI	Niš Air Base	Asphalt
Kovin	LY87		Kovin Air Base	Asphalt
Sjenica	LYSJ		Dubinje Air Base	Asphalt
Sombor	LYSO		Sombor Air Base	Concrete
Airfields
Belgrade	LYBJ		Lisičji Jarak Airfield	Grass
Belgrade	LYPB		Progar Airfield	Grass
Belgrade	LYZP		Zemun Polje Airfield	Grass
Bor	LYBO		Bor Airfield	Asphalt
Čačak	LYCA		Čačak Airfield	Grass/asphalt
Jagodina	LYJA		Jagodina Airfield	Grass
Kikinda	LYKI		Kikinda Airfield	Grass
Knjaževac	LYKZ		Knjaževac Airfield	Grass
Kraljevo	LYKA		Kraljevo Airfield	Grass
Leskovac	LYLE		Leskovac Airfield	Grass
Novi Sad	LYNS		Novi Sad Airfield	Grass
Novi Sad			Jugovićevo Airfield (sr)	Grass
Pančevo	LYPA		Pančevo Airfield	Grass
Paraćin	LYPN		Paraćin Airfield	Grass
Požarevac	LYKT		Kostolac Airfield	Grass
Požarevac			Požarevac Airfield	Grass
Smederevo	LYSD		Smederevo Airfield	Grass
Smederevska Palanka	LYSP		Smederevska Palanka Airfield	Grass
Sremska Mitrovica	LYSM		Sremska Mitrovica Airfield	Grass
Subotica	LYSU		Subotica Airfield	Grass
Trstenik	LYTR		Trstenik Airfield	Grass/concrete
Valjevo	LYVA		Valjevo Airfield	Grass
Vršac	LYVR		Vršac Airfield	Asphalt
Zrenjanin	LYZR		Zrenjanin Airfield	Grass

- Note: italics indicate defunct airfield or air base.

== See also ==
- Airports of Serbia
- Transport in Serbia
