= Paraćin Airfield =

Airfield in Paraćin, Serbia

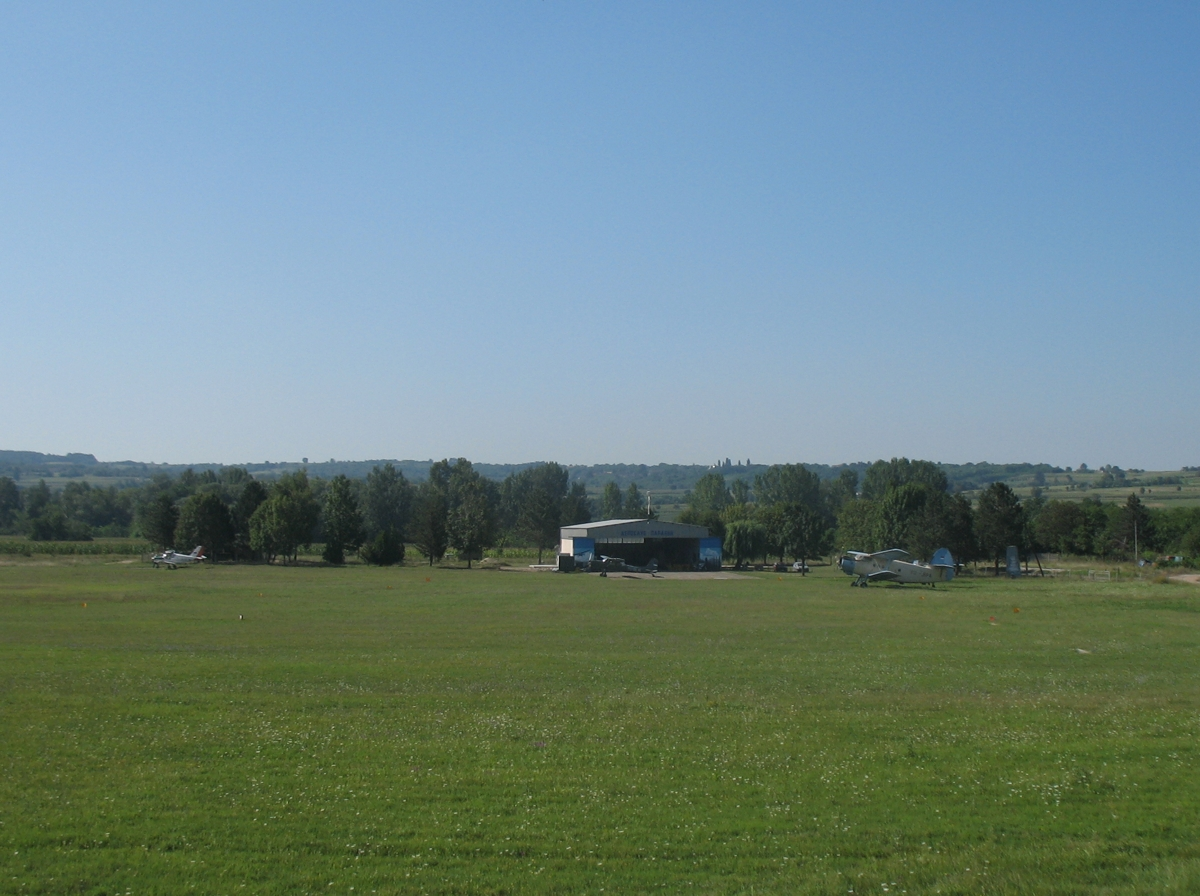
- IATA: none; ICAO: LYPN

Summary
- Airport type: Civil
- Location: Paraćin
- Elevation AMSL: 532 ft (162 m)
- Coordinates: 43°51′59.21″N 21°29′14.11″E

Map
- Location within Serbia

Runways
Direction	Length		Surface
Direction	ft	m	Surface
10/28	2,953	900	Grass

Paraćin Airfield (ICAO: LYPN), also known as the Davidovac Airfield (Serbian: Аеродром Давидовац, Aerodrom Davidovac) is a recreational aerodrome near the town of Paraćin, Serbia. Its runway is 900 metres long and 50 metres wide.

== See also ==
- List of airports in Serbia
