= Kostolac Airfield =

Airfield in Kostolac, Serbia

- IATA: none; ICAO: LYKT

Summary
- Airport type: Public
- Operator: Government of Serbia
- Serves: Požarevac
- Location: Kostolac, Serbia
- Elevation AMSL: 223 ft (68 m)
- Coordinates: 44°44′5.802″N 21°9′42.3576″E

Map
- Location within Serbia

Runways
Direction	Length		Surface
Direction	ft	m	Surface
12/30	2,297	700	Grass

Kostolac Airfield (Serbian: Аеродром Костолац / Aerodrom Kostolac) (ICAO: LYKT) is situated on the bank of the Danube River, built in 1998 on the power plant's reclaimed former ash yard. It is two kilometres from the Kostolac town centre and also near the town of Požarevac.

Landing at Kostolac Airfield is unique because the way of landing is over the Danube water plane, which is similar to landing on an aircraft carrier.

The airfield is close to the ancient Roman city of Viminacium.

== See also ==
- List of airports in Serbia
