= Vöslauer (disambiguation) =

Vöslauer is an Austrian mineral water brand.

Vöslauer may also refer to:

- of or from Bad Vöslau in Austria
- a synonym for the red wine grape Blauer Portugieser

== See also ==
- Vöslauer weißer Schaumwein ('white sparkling wine of Vöslau'), Robert Schlumberger von Goldeck's first sparkling wine
