= Großau, Bad Vöslau =

Cadastral municipality in Austria

Coordinates: 47°57′21″N 16°10′3″E

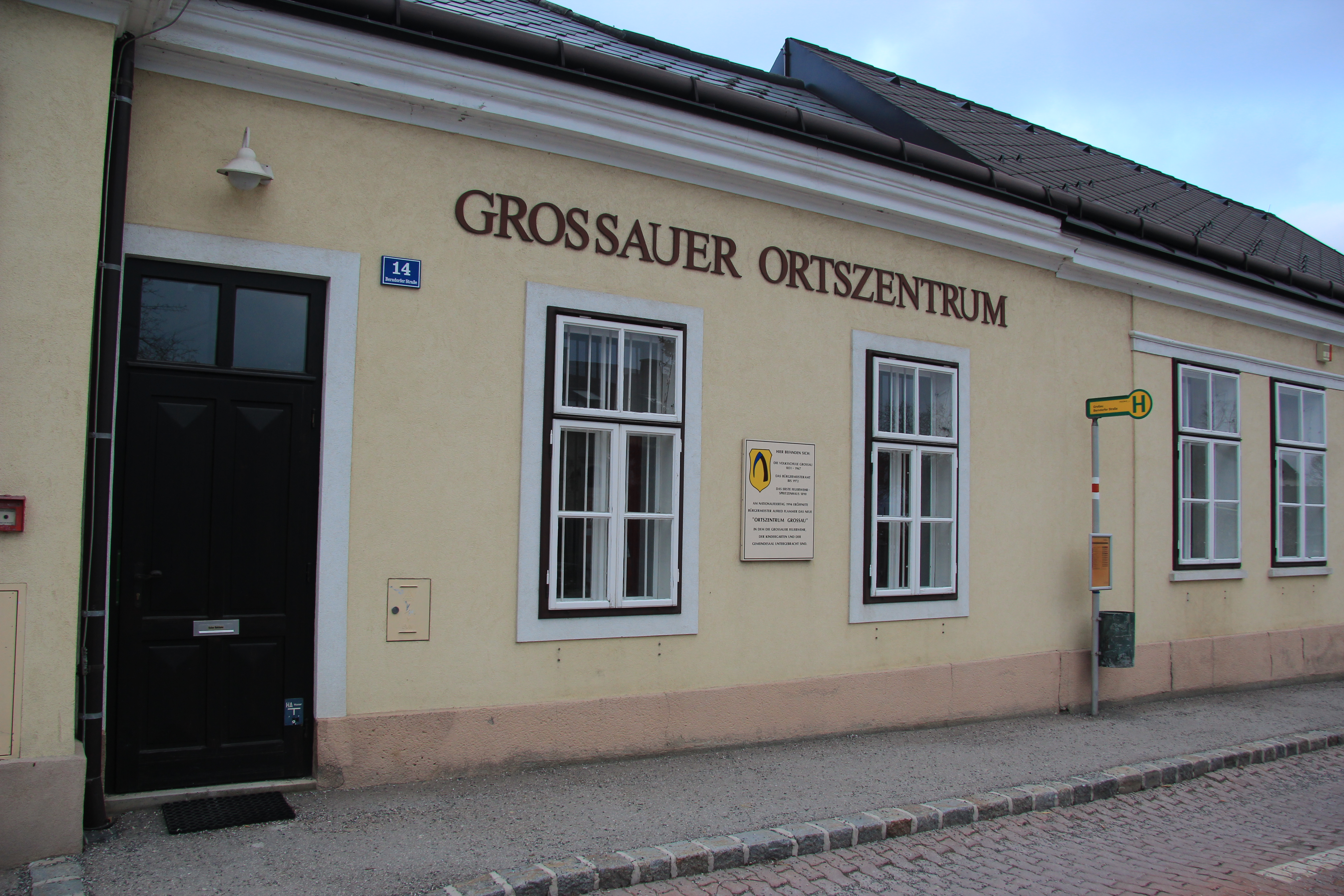
Großau town center

Großau is a village and a cadastral community within the city of Bad Vöslau.

== Geography ==
Großau is situated west of Gainfarn in the western part of the municipality of Bad Vöslau. The village can be reached on Bad Vöslauer Straße (B 212) from Berndorf in the west and from Bad Vöslau in the east. Access is also possible from the south via St Veit an der Triesting (part of Berndorf).

== Statistics ==
- Population of cadastral community (January 1, 2022): 532
- Area: 7.1 km² (2.74 sq mi)

== History ==
The place was first mentioned in 1136 in the Klosterneuburg Salbuch, in which the donation of two vineyards in Großau to the Klosterneuburg monastery was noted. The document of the foundation of the filial church St Katharina, which always belonged to Gainfarn parish, dates back to 1369.

The village, originally laid out around a triangular green, developed into a linear settlement in the early Modern era.

In 1603, Jonas von Heyßberg merged the Großau dominion and the Merkenstein dominion, which Gundakar von Dietrichstein acquired in 1672. The administration of the dominion, which was first established in Merkenstein castle, was transferred to Gainfarn after the castle had been destroyed in 1683 during the Ottoman wars.

The linear settlement with several farmsteads is listed in the Franciscan cadastre of 1819. In addition to agriculture, viticulture and animal breeding, the retrieval and trading of pitch and turpentine also gained some importance.

As a result of the revolution of 1848/1849 the feudal system was abolished. After the Municipality Act of 1849 came into force, Großau became an independent municipality, and the population elected the last Dorfrichter (Schultheiß) of Großau as the first mayor. Three years later, Großau got its primary school, which was not closed down until 1967.

The filial church was renovated in 1918/19 by Arthur Krupp, who had acquired the Merkenstein estate in 1917. According to the Adressbuch von Österreich für Industrie, Handel, Gewerbe und Landwirtschaft (Directory of Austria for Industry, Trade, Business, and Agriculture) of 1938, a baker, a butcher, a hairdresser, two transport ventures, three grocers, a wood merchant and two cobblers were resident in the municipality of Großau. Also, the Merkenstein estate sold its products.

On January 1, 1972, the local communities of Bad Vöslau, Gainfarn and Großau were merged.

== Public facilities ==
There is a kindergarten in Großau.

Großau has a fire station of the local Volunteer Fire Brigade.
