= Gratzer =

Gratzer may refer to:

== People ==
- David Gratzer, Canadian physician and writer
- George Grätzer, Hungarian Canadian mathematician and author
- Walter Gratzer (1932–2021), British biophysical chemist
- Wolfgang Gratzer, Austrian musicologist

== Other ==
- Grätzer, a Polish beer style
