= Vöslau Airfield =

Vöslau Airfield Flugplatz Vöslau
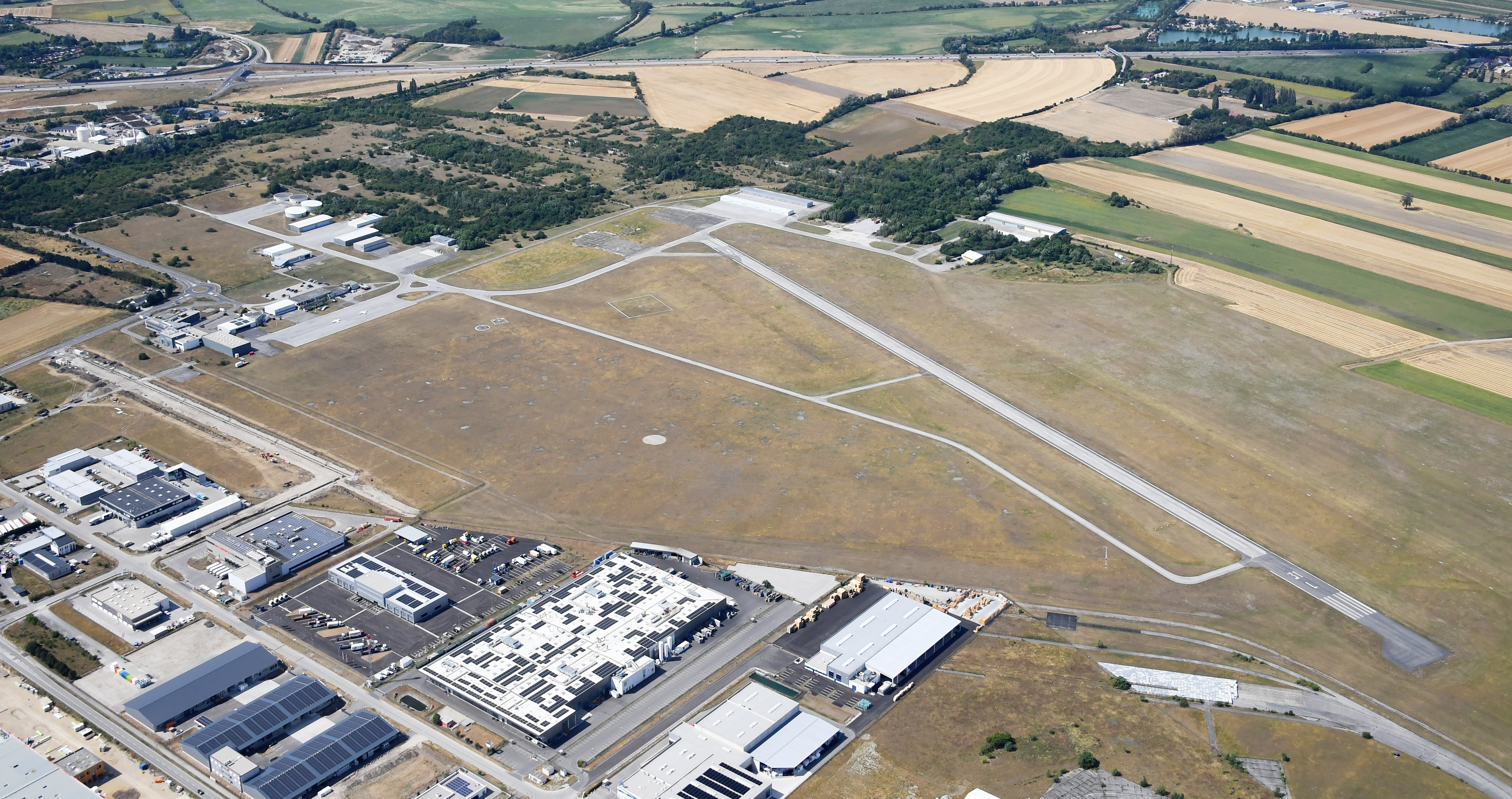
- IATA: none; ICAO: LOAV

Summary
- Airport type: Public
- Serves: Bad Vöslau, Austria
- Elevation AMSL: 764 ft / 233 m
- Coordinates: 47°57′52.8″N 016°15′39.4″E
- Website: loav.at (in German)

Map
- Location of Vöslau Airfield in Austria

Runways
Direction	Length		Surface
Direction	ft	m	Surface
13/31	3,270	997	Asphalt
13/31	2,020	616	Grass
- Source: Landings.com

Vöslau Airfield (German: Flugplatz Vöslau, ICAO: LOAV) is a public airfield located 4 kilometres (2.5 mi) east of Bad Vöslau, Lower Austria, Austria. It is also known as Flugplatz Vöslau-Kottingbrunn in German. It is used for general aviation.

== See also ==
- Transport in Austria
- List of airports in Austria
