= Wolfgang Gratzer =

Austrian musicologist (born 1965)

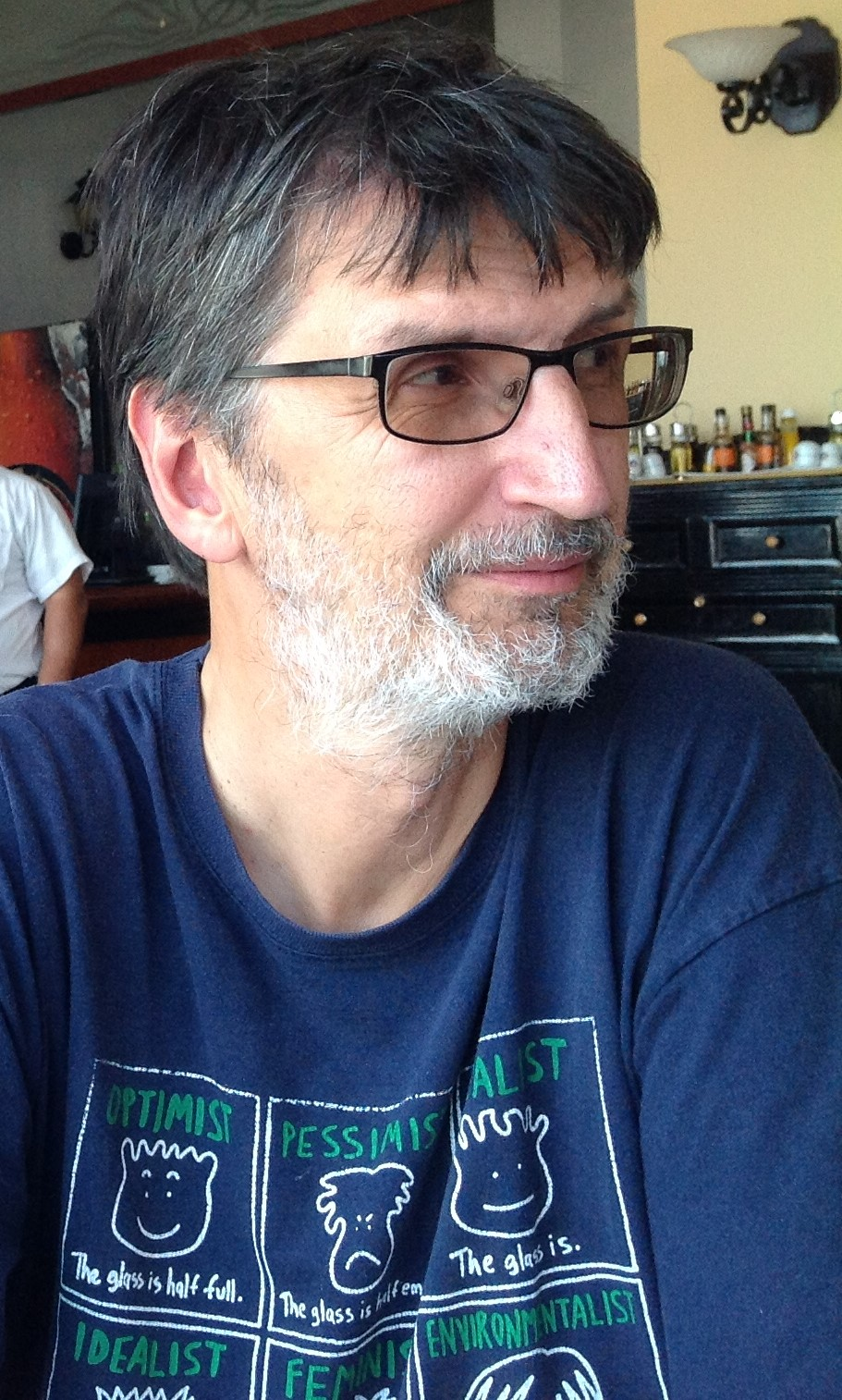
Wolfgang Gratzer during a research trip on the topic of "street concerts" in migration contexts in Santiago di Cuba (November 2015)

Wolfgang Gratzer (born 1965 in Bad Vöslau) is an Austrian musicologist.

From 2011 to 2014, he was involved in the management of the interuniversity doctoral program "Art and Public". From 2015 to 2018, he was in charge of the 3-year inter-university doctoral program "The Arts and its Public Impact". Concepts - Transfer - Resonance.
