= Vöslauer =

Mineral water brand in Austria

Vöslauer Mineralwasser GmbH
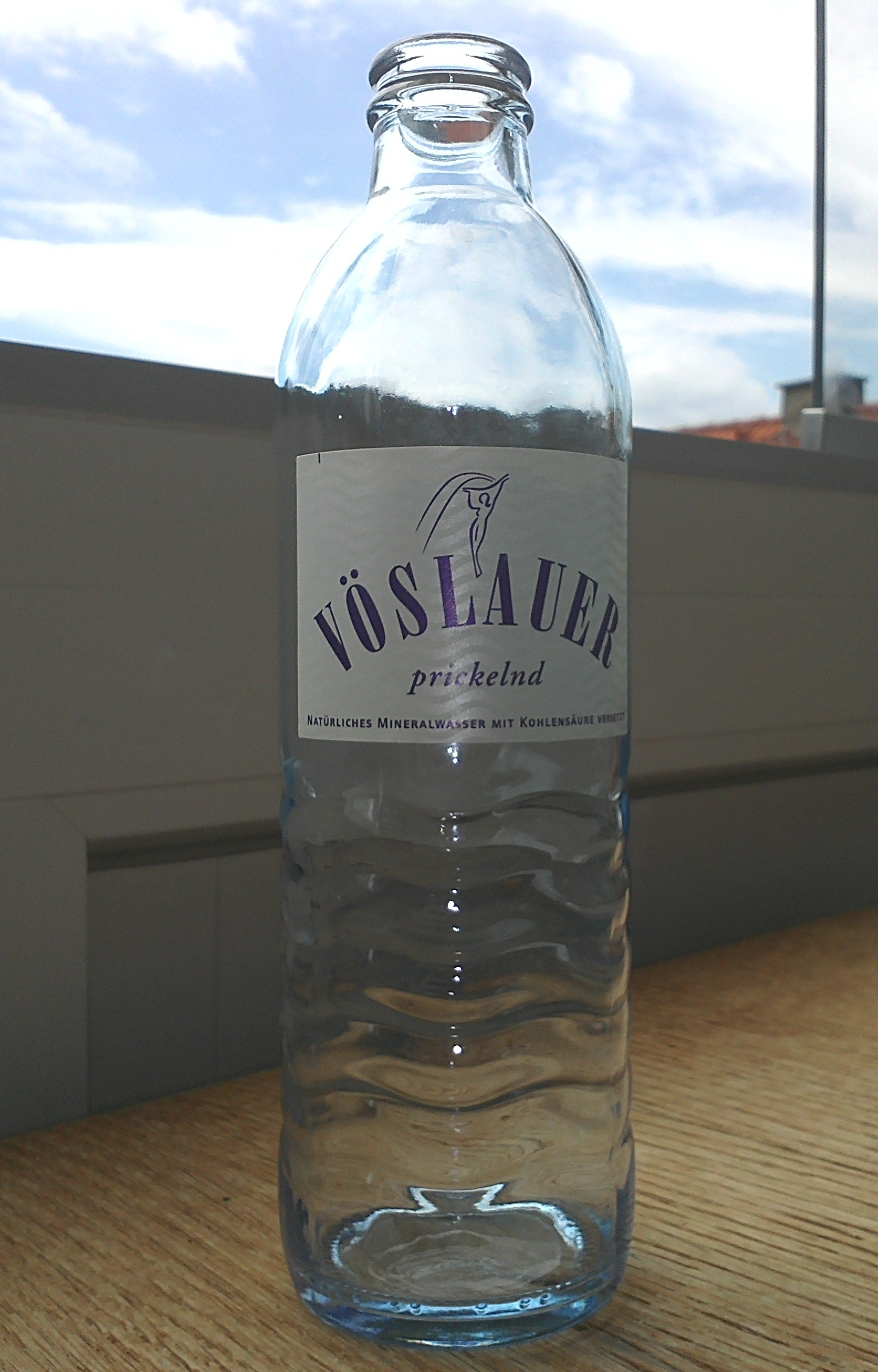
- A bottle of mineral water
- Company type: GmbH
- Industry: Bottled water
- Founded: 1936 (90 years ago)
- Headquarters: Bad Vöslau, Austria
- Key people: Birgit Aichinger, Herbert Schlossnikl (Managing directors)
- Number of employees: 220 (2024)
- Parent: Ottakringer
- Website: www.voeslauer.com

Vöslauer Mineralwasser GmbH is an Austrian mineral water company located in Bad Vöslau and is a subsidiary of Ottakringer brewing company. Vöslauer is also responsible for bottling of Almdudler, a popular Austrian soft drink. Up until the end of 2021, they also bottled and marketed drinks by Pepsi.

== History ==
The company was founded in 1936 by the Zentralsparkasse as Vöslauer Heilquellenverwertungsgesellschaft (Healing source company). The water for the thermal spa Bad Vöslau comes from the same source.

On January 1, 2010 the company was made a subsidiary of Ottakringer brewing company.

In 2018 the company had a revenue of 102.96 million Euro. While maintaining an export quota of 18%, the revenue rose to 106 million Euro in 2019.

Since beginning of 2020, all PET bottles used are being made of 100% recycled material. In 2019 a record amount of about 1.1 billion PET bottles were recycled.

== Water source ==
The 660-meter-deep water source is an artesian well.

The source was known to the Romans and was used as a healing spring as early as 50 A.D. In the middle ages, in written documents from 1136, it was referenced as Feselover source. The healing properties were certified by analysis in 1822 and the thermal spa was opened.
