= Gainfarn =

Village in Lower Austria, Austria

Coordinates: 47°57′48″N 16°12′5″E

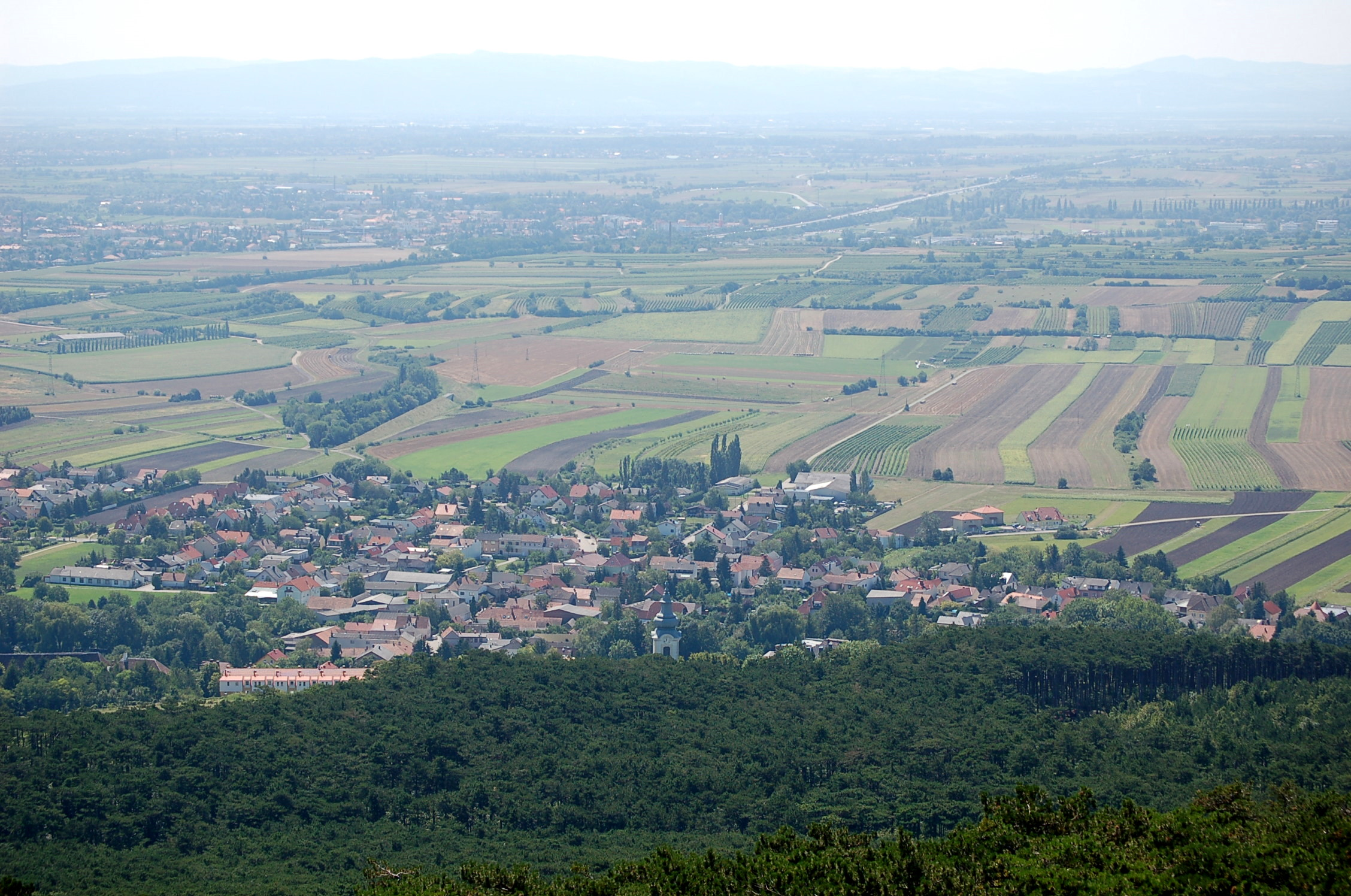
View of Gainfarn from Harzberg

Gainfarn is a village on the western edge of Bad Vöslau, in Lower Austria, Austria. It is an urban quarter and a cadastral community within Bad Vöslau city.

== Geography ==
Gainfarn borders to the southwestern part of Bad Vöslau town. Bad Vöslauer Straße (B 212) is running through it. In addition to Gainfarn village, the cadastral community consists of the hamlet of Haidlhof and a few individual sites, including Merkenstein Castle.

== Statistics ==
- Area of cadastral community: 23.39 km² (9.03 sq mi)
- Population (1 January 2022)
  - Total: 3819
  - Density: 163/km² (423/sq mi)

== History ==
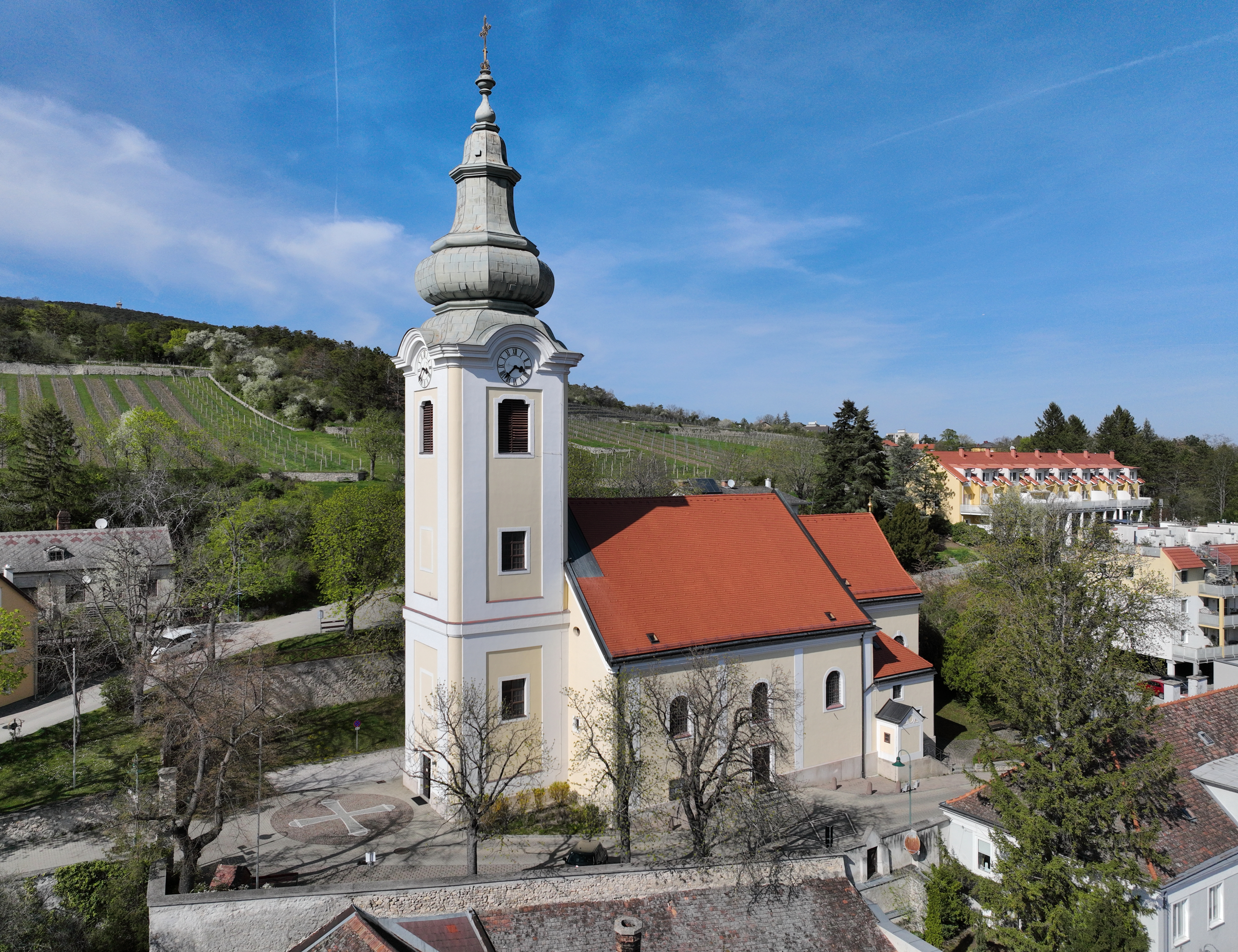
Parish church

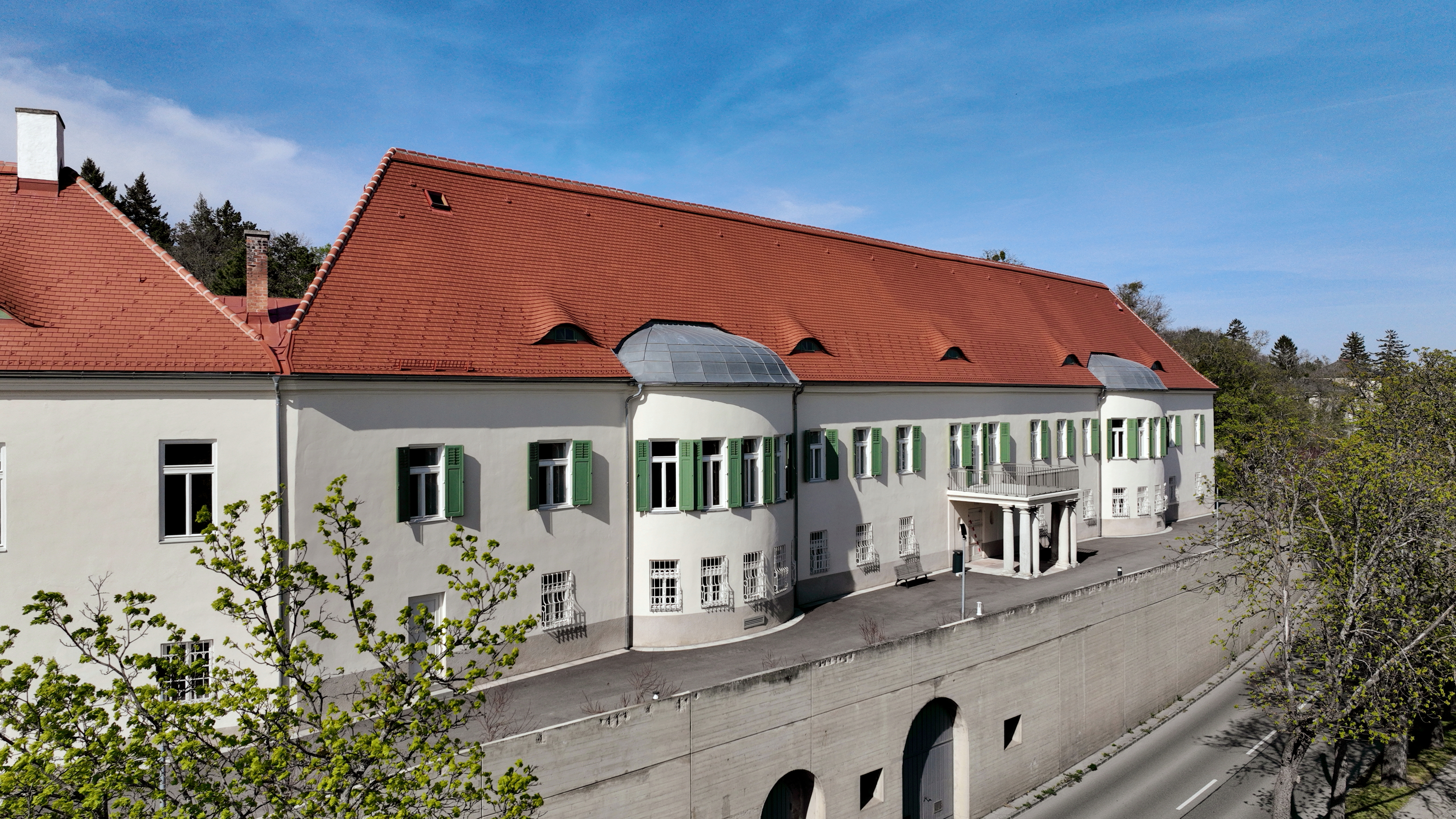
Gainfarn Castle

Gainfarn probably originated in the 11th century; at the beginning of the 12th century a vineyard in the village is mentioned and around 1136 it is documented that some Reginbert bequeathed a farm in Goinurin to the Klosterneuburg Monastery. From 1206 to about 1430 a family named after the place (... von Gainfarn) is documented.

The Gainfarn church existed before the 14th century, but was only mentioned in a document in 1312, when the previous filial church was detached from Traiskirchen parish and became a parish of its own.

In 1448 the estate and village were merged with the Merkenstein dominion and were owned by the Hohenberg family. After Gainfarn had been devastated by Hungarian troops of Matthias Corvinus, Johann von Hohenberg sold the dominion to Emperor Frederick III in 1484. He had them managed by pfleger – the Lords of Haid; from 1542 to 1585 Franz von Ficin, a Protestant, was in charge.

In 1529 and again in 1683, Gainfarn was destroyed in the course of the Ottoman wars, as was Merkenstein Castle. The administration of Merkenstein domion, which was owned by Gundakar von Dietrichstein since 1675, was moved to Gainfarn.

In 1713/14 the plague claimed 63 victims.

In the Franciscan cadastre of 1819, the triangular street village is already listed with numerous smaller and larger farmsteads.

After the abolition of the feudal system as a result of the revolution of 1848/1849, Gainfarn became an independent municipality in 1849.

In 1864 a cold water medical institution was built at a previously discovered spring; in 1879 it was expanded and a sanatorium was added. In 1932 it had to be closed due to economic difficulties; the building was redesigned in 1953/54 as a company housing complex for employees of the Vöslauer Kammgarnfabrik (Vöslau Worsted Factory).

According to Adressbuch von Österreich für Industrie, Handel, Gewerbe und Landwirtschaft (Directory of Austria for Industry, Trade, Business, and Agriculture) in 1938, numerous tradespeople and businesses were resident in the municipality of Gainfarn.

On January 1, 1972, the municipality of Gainfarn was merged with the municipality of Bad Vöslau, as it had been before part of Bad Vöslau during the Nazi era.

== Public facilities ==
In Gainfarn, there are two kindergartens, an elementary school, and Realgymnasium Bad Vöslau – Gainfarn. Gainfarn also has a fire station of the local volunteer fire brigade.

== Culture and sights ==
- Gainfarn Palace, now housing Bad Vöslau Music School
- Catholic Parish Church John the Baptist
