= Merkenstein ruins =

- Ruine Merkenstein
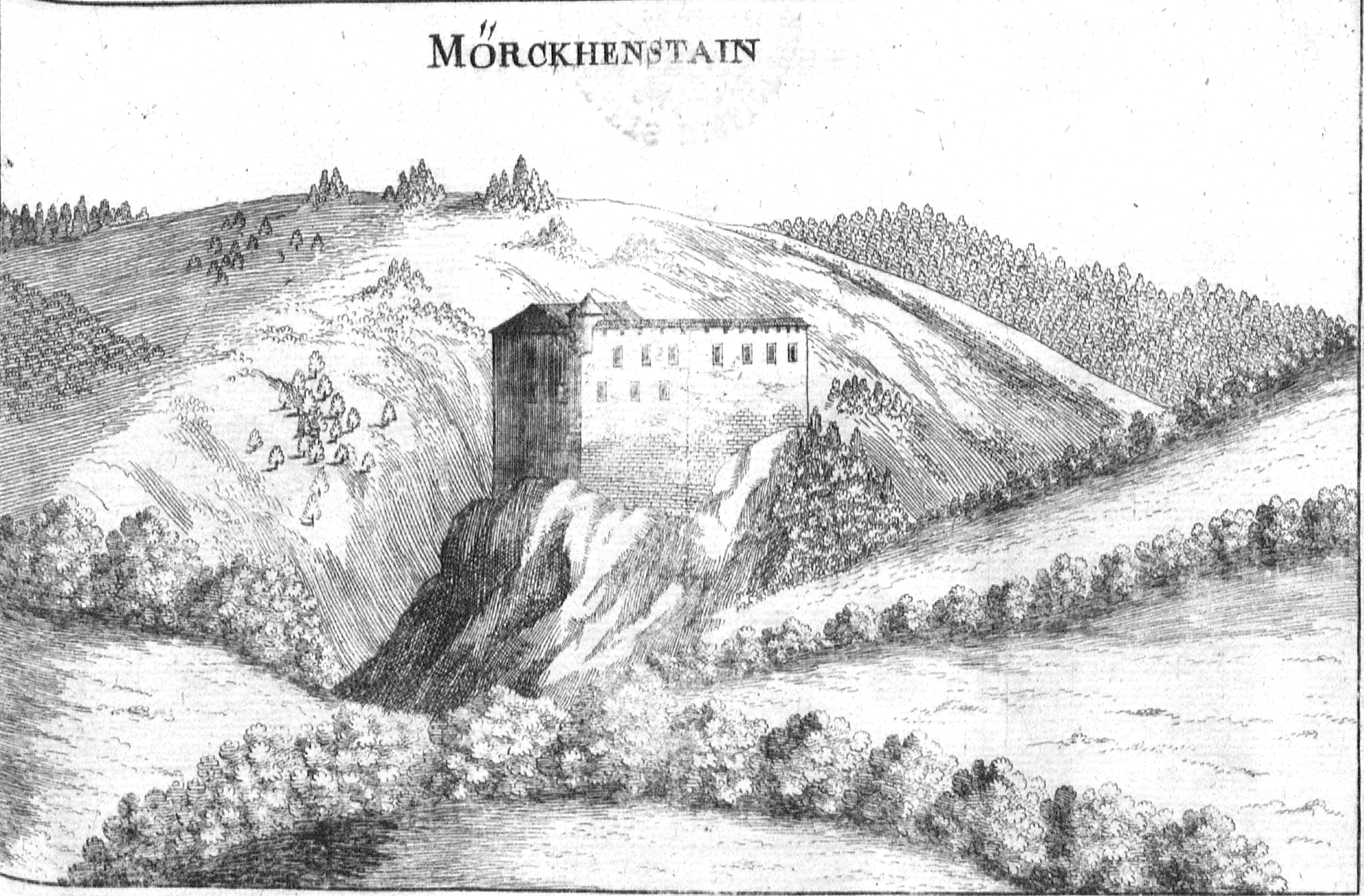
- Engraving of Merkenstein in 1670 by Georg Matthäus Vischer

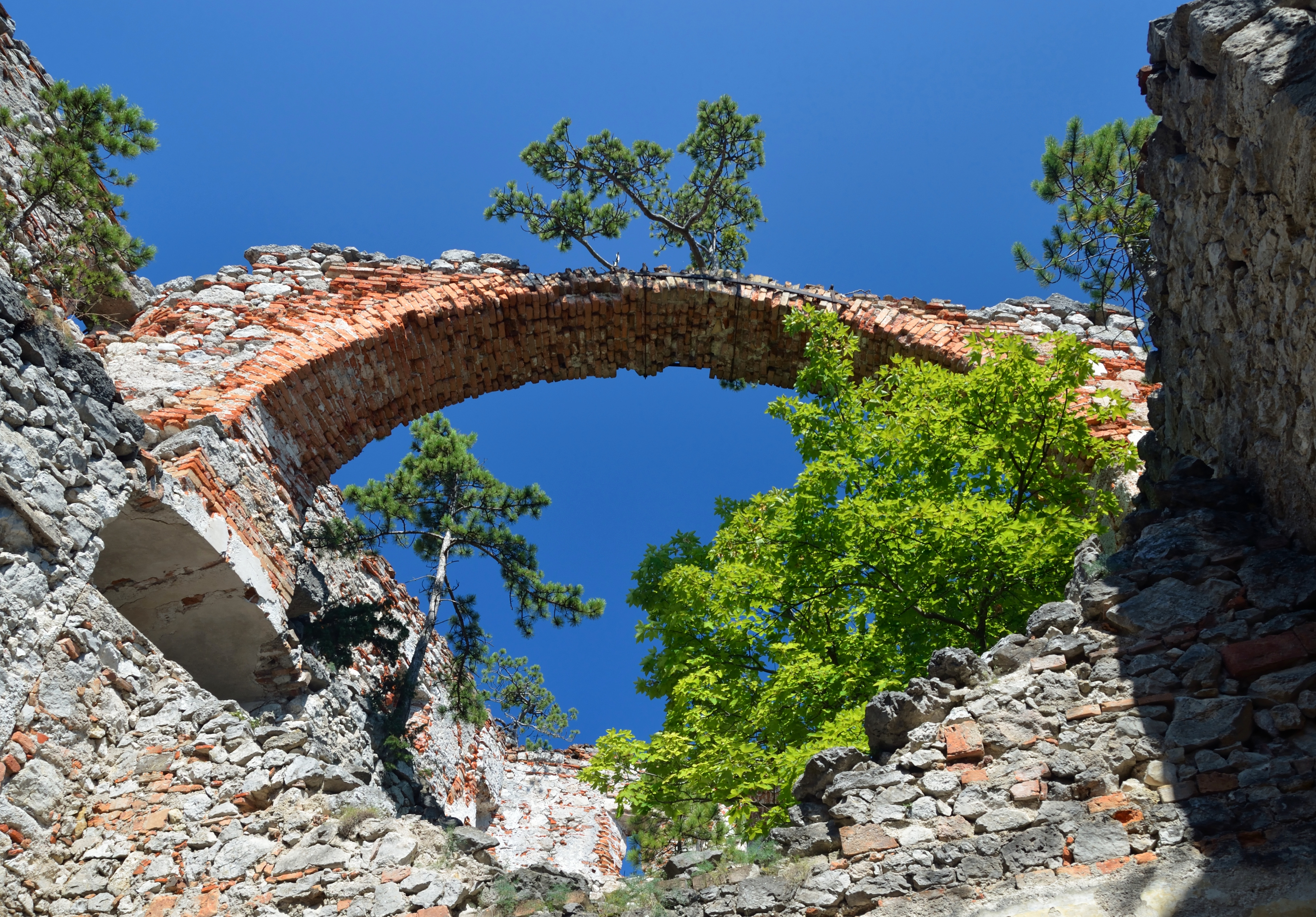
- An arch in the Merkenstein ruin, photographed in 2012

Site information
- Owner: Austrian government
- Open to the public: Yes
- Condition: ruin

Location
- Coordinates: 47.98226°N 16.13364°E

Site history
- Built: Before 1166

The Merkenstein ruins are the remains of a castle in Lower Austria near Bad Vöslau in the Großau cadastre (property register). In some sources, it is mentioned as early as the year 1141. The first definite mention is in the Codex Falkensteinensis in 1170. Ludwig van Beethoven dedicated two Lieder to the ruin.

== History ==
In 1486, the castle was captured by king Matthias Corvinus of Hungary. After this period, it was managed by imperial guardians; from 1603 to 1672 it was owned by the Heißperger family, and afterwards by the Dietrichstein family. In 1683 the castle was taken over and destroyed by Ottoman troops.

In the 1600s, Merkenstein controlled Gainfarn, Großau (in Bad Vöslau), Pottenstein, Furth, Muggendorf and St. Veit (in Berndorf).

Besides the much younger Schloss Merkenstein, about 40% of the Großau congregation belonged to Merkenstein. Until the end of World War II, the castle and its precinct belonged to the Krupp family. After the war it fell under the control of the Administration for Soviet Property in Austria, as German property. In accordance with the Austrian State Treaty, the castle became the property of the Austrian state, controlled by National Parks Austria. The castle has been privately owned since 1978 and has since been carefully restored.

In October 2008, the Austrian TV crime drama Vier Frauen und ein Todesfall (Four Women and a Funeral) was filmed at the ruin.

== Merkenstein Cave ==
To the east under the Merkenstein ruins is the Merkenstein Cave (accessible only on guided tours). The 72 m long cave, also called Merkensteinerhöhle or Merkensteiner Höhle (Cat. No. 1911/32) in a Baden dolomite breccia (about the same age as the Leithakalk) has a 15 m difference in altitude. It was analysed in 1921 by Franz Mühlhofer with regard to both prehistoric finds and phosphate-containing earths. The Austrian cave fertiliser campaign was a state-planned enterprise to produce artificial fertiliser during the First World War in Austria. Approx. 6.5 t of cave soil was extracted by the Krupp estate management and sold or used as cave fertiliser to improve the meadows and the zoo. The cave floor was of great scientific value. People spoke of the "cradle of mankind near Vienna" and the "cave of twenty million bones". During the castle's existence from the early Middle Ages until its destruction in 1683, the cave was used to dispose of all the castle inhabitants' waste. The top layer of sediment showed that the cave was a place of refuge during the Turkish wars of 1529 and 1683. There is a protective wall in the cave from 1529.

== Gallery ==
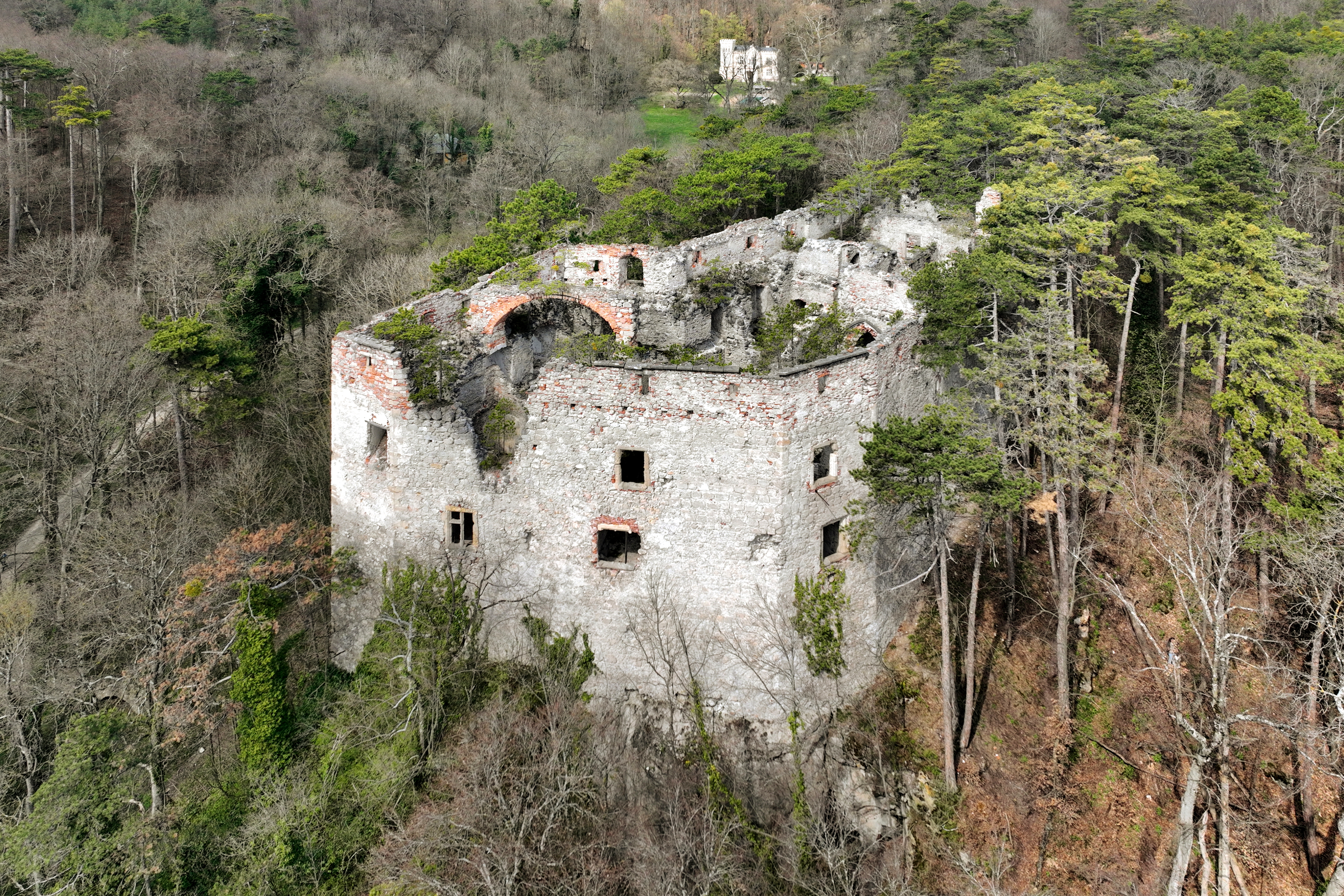
Southeast view of the Merkenstein castle ruins

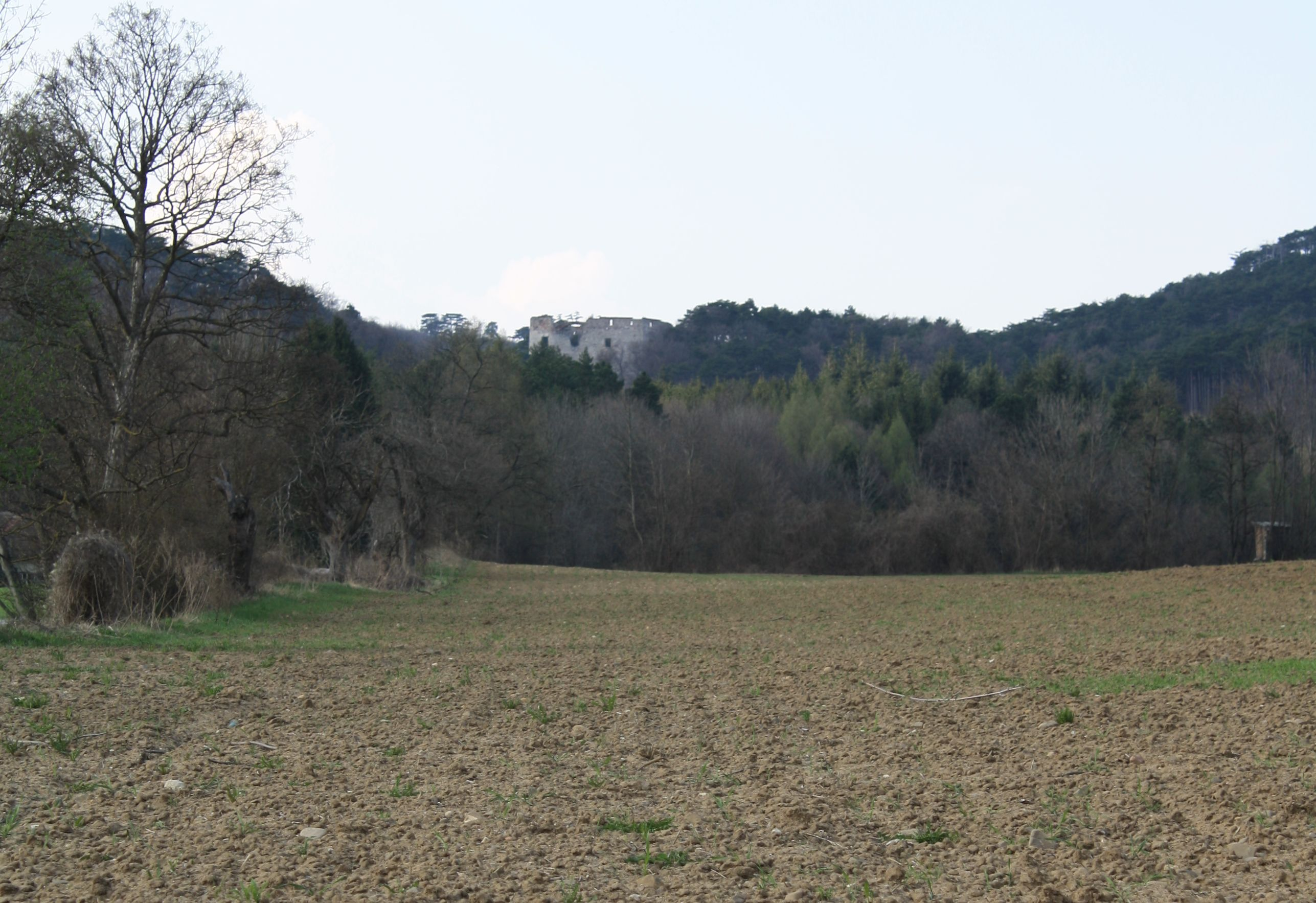
View of the ruin from the Großau – Schwarzensee road

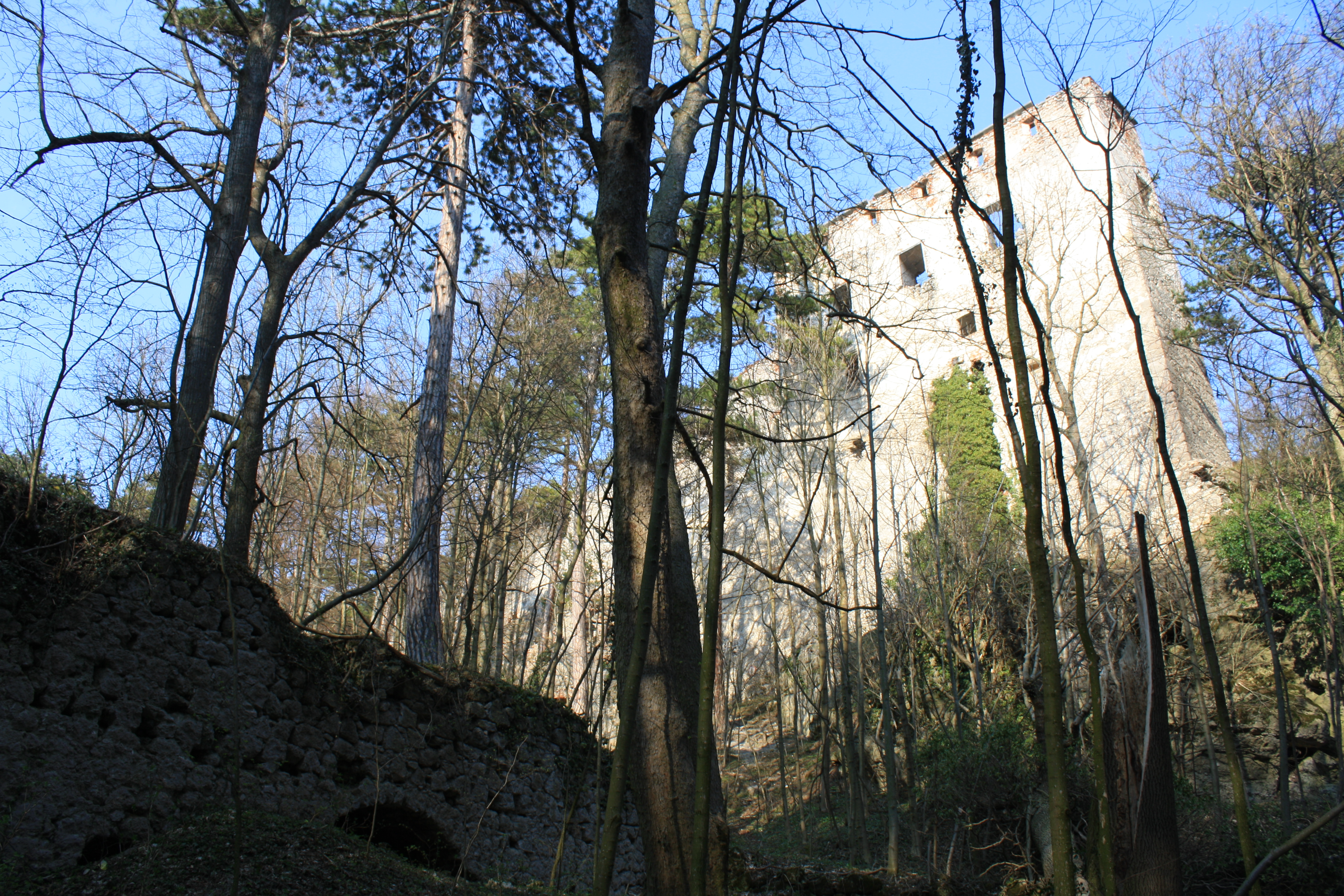
View of the ruin from the access road
