= Bad Vöslau =

Bad Vöslau Bod Vöslau
- Municipality
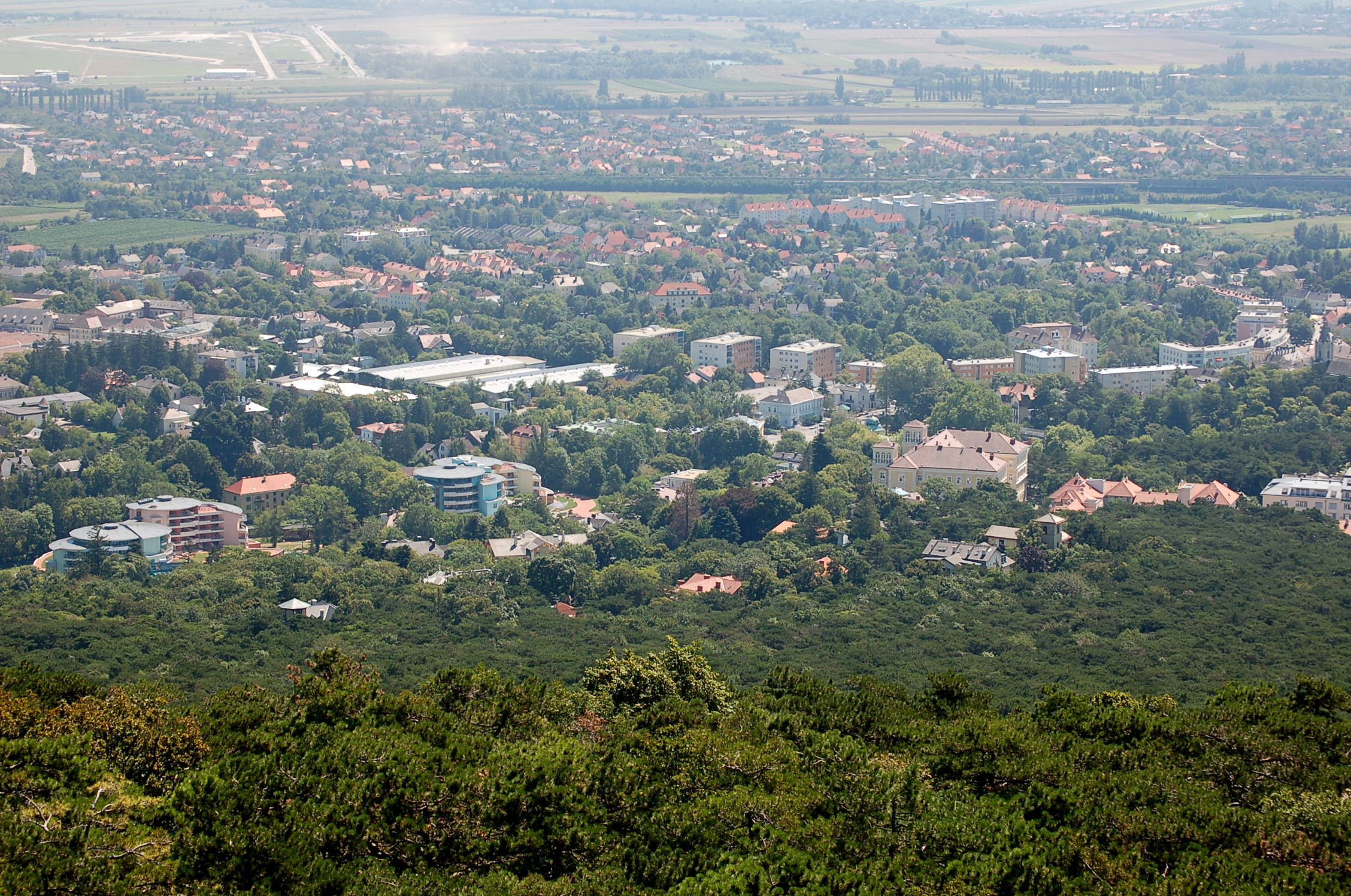
- Bad Vöslau

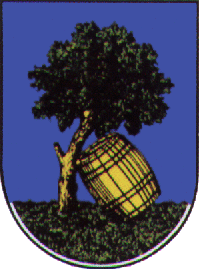
- Coat of arms

- Location within Austria
- Coordinates: 47°58′N 16°13′E
- Country: Austria
- State: Lower Austria
- District: Baden

Government
  - Mayor: Christian Flammer

Area
  - Total: 38.75 km^{2} (14.96 sq mi)
- Elevation: 276 m (906 ft)

Population (2022)
  - Total: 12,424
  - Density: 320.6/km^{2} (830.4/sq mi)
- Time zone: UTC+1 (CET)
  - Summer (DST): UTC+2 (CEST)
- Postal code: 2540
- Area code: 02252

Bad Vöslau (German: [baːt fœsˈlaʊ̯]; Central Bavarian: Bod Vöslau) is a spa town and municipality in the state of Lower Austria. It is also known as the cradle of the Austrian red wine cultivation. The population, as of 2022, is 12,424.

== Geography ==
Bad Vöslau is located 35 km south of Vienna on the slope of the Vienna Woods mountains to the Vienna Basin. The Thermenlinie fault line running there is the cause of several thermal springs.

=== Municipality Structure ===
The municipality of Bad Vöslau is composed of three localities and cadastral communities, namely the city of Bad Vöslau, and the villages of Gainfarn and Großau.

== History ==
Traces of colonization dating back to the Neolithic period have been found in the area.

In the Roman era, the place was a part of the province of Pannonia. Already then, people made use of the thermal springs in the area.

The name “Vöslau” (as in: Adololdus de Veselove) was first found in a written document of Klosterneuburg Monastery dating from 1136. At that time, the settlement was only a castle that was encircled by a ditch. It was destroyed by King Matthias Corvinus in 1483, but was subsequently rebuilt. It became of great significance during the Reformation movement.

During the Counter-Reformation the parish of Vöslau was incorporated in neighbouring Gainfarn parish.

In the 18th century, the Vöslau dominion was purchased by the influential Fries family. Count Johann von Fries, whose vineyards were situated around Vöslau, was the first to grow red wine on a large scale in this region. Under the Fries family, Vöslau flourished. The old castle was expanded and remodelled in Baroque style.

After Count Moritz von Fries had gone bankrupt in 1826, Giorgios Sinas acquired the dominion and palace of Vöslau, but sold it to Johann Heinrich von Geymüller the Younger, a Swiss banker, just one year later. In 1833, Geymüller established the Vöslau worsted wool factory (Vöslauer Kammgarnfabrik), which became a major source of employment in Vöslau until it was closed down in 1978.

In 1841, the Southern Railway to (then) Neunkirchen was opened, so that Vöslau could now be reached by train via (now) Bad Vöslau railway station. In the second half of the 19th century, tourism became another major economic sector. Wealthy families used to spend the summer months in rented houses with their entire households. For this purpose, villas were built on the slopes west of the village centre. In 1822, a first public bath was opened; large portions of it were rebuilt between 1869 and 1873 by architect Theophil Hansen.

On 26 August 1867 the Treaty of Vöslau was signed between the Kingdom of Greece and the Principality of Serbia.

In 1904 Vöslau was officially declared a spa town; the name of the municipality, though, was not until 1928 changed to Bad Vöslau (by resolution of the Landtag of Lower Austrian [the state parliament] of 27 March 1928). The public swimming baths were again rebuilt and were opened on 20 June 1926, with Federal President Michael Hainisch attending.

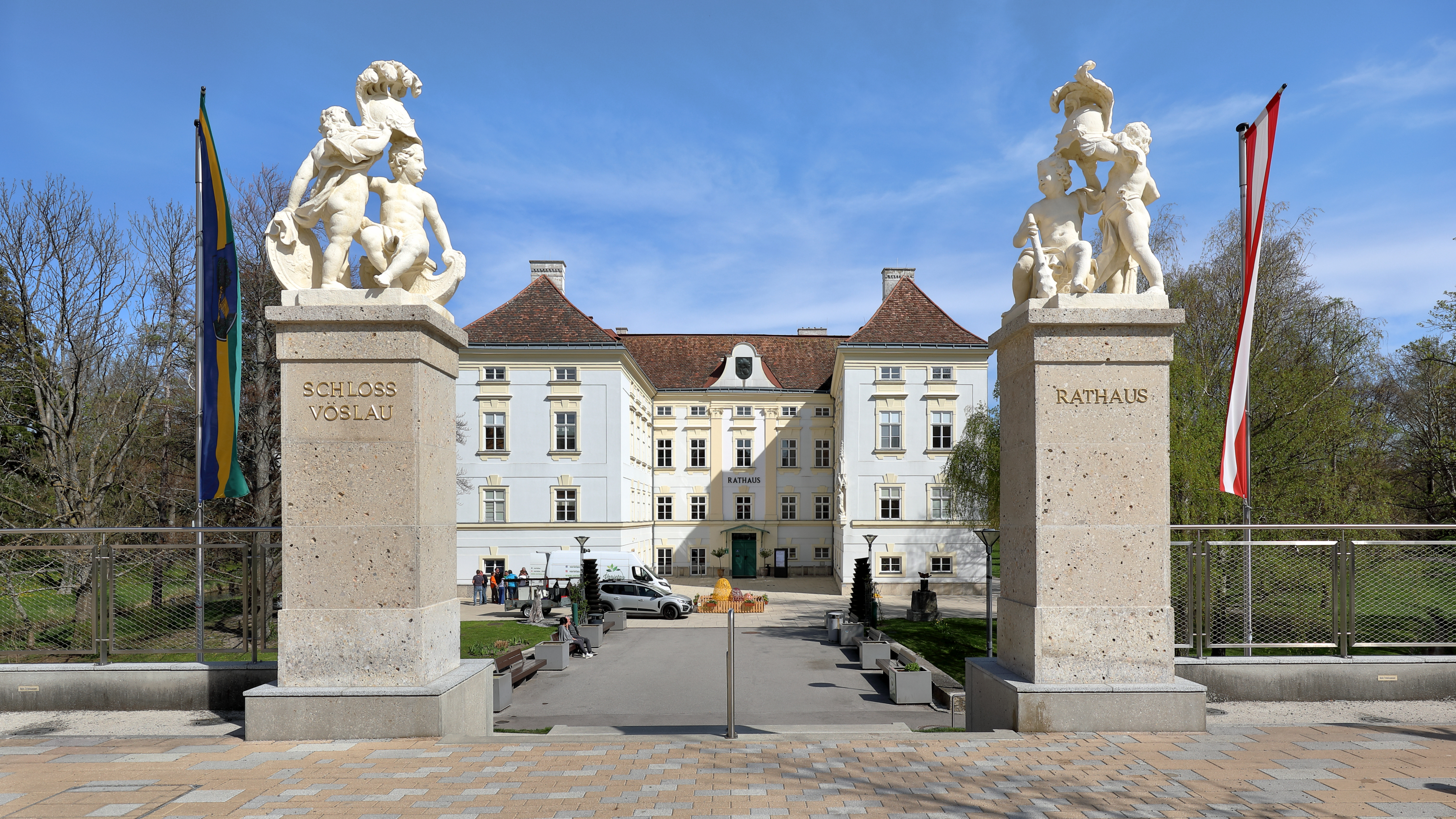
Vöslau Castle

In 1936, a company was founded to merchandise the thermal water, which is being sold under the brand name Vöslauer (add: Mineralwasser, i. e. mineral water) since then.

Wine-growing is also another important part of the economy. The red wine and the sparkling wine from Vöslau were made famous worldwide by Robert Schlumberger in the 19th century.

In 1954, Bad Vöslau became a city. In the same year, the brand "Vöslauer Stadtsiegel" was created. On 1 January 1972 the neighbouring municipalities of Gainfarn and Großau were incorporated into Bad Vöslau.

== Populations ==
Historical population
Year	Pop.	±%
1869	4,176	—
1880	5,453	+30.6%
1890	6,330	+16.1%
1900	6,987	+10.4%
1910	7,799	+11.6%
1923	8,312	+6.6%
1934	8,602	+3.5%
1939	9,848	+14.5%
1951	9,166	−6.9%
1961	9,223	+0.6%
1971	10,204	+10.6%
1981	10,524	+3.1%
1991	11,055	+5.0%
2001	10,998	−0.5%
2011	10,309	−6.3%

== Politics ==
The Bad Vöslau city council (Gemeinderat) consists of 37 seats. As of the 2020 elections, these are allocated as follows:

- 19 Liste Flammer (an independent party founded by Alfred Flammer)
- 7 GREEN Party
- 4 ÖVP
- 3 SPÖ
- 2 FPÖ
- 2 NEOS

In December 2022, Christian Flammer succeeded Christoph Prinz, who stepped down, as mayor.

== Personalities ==
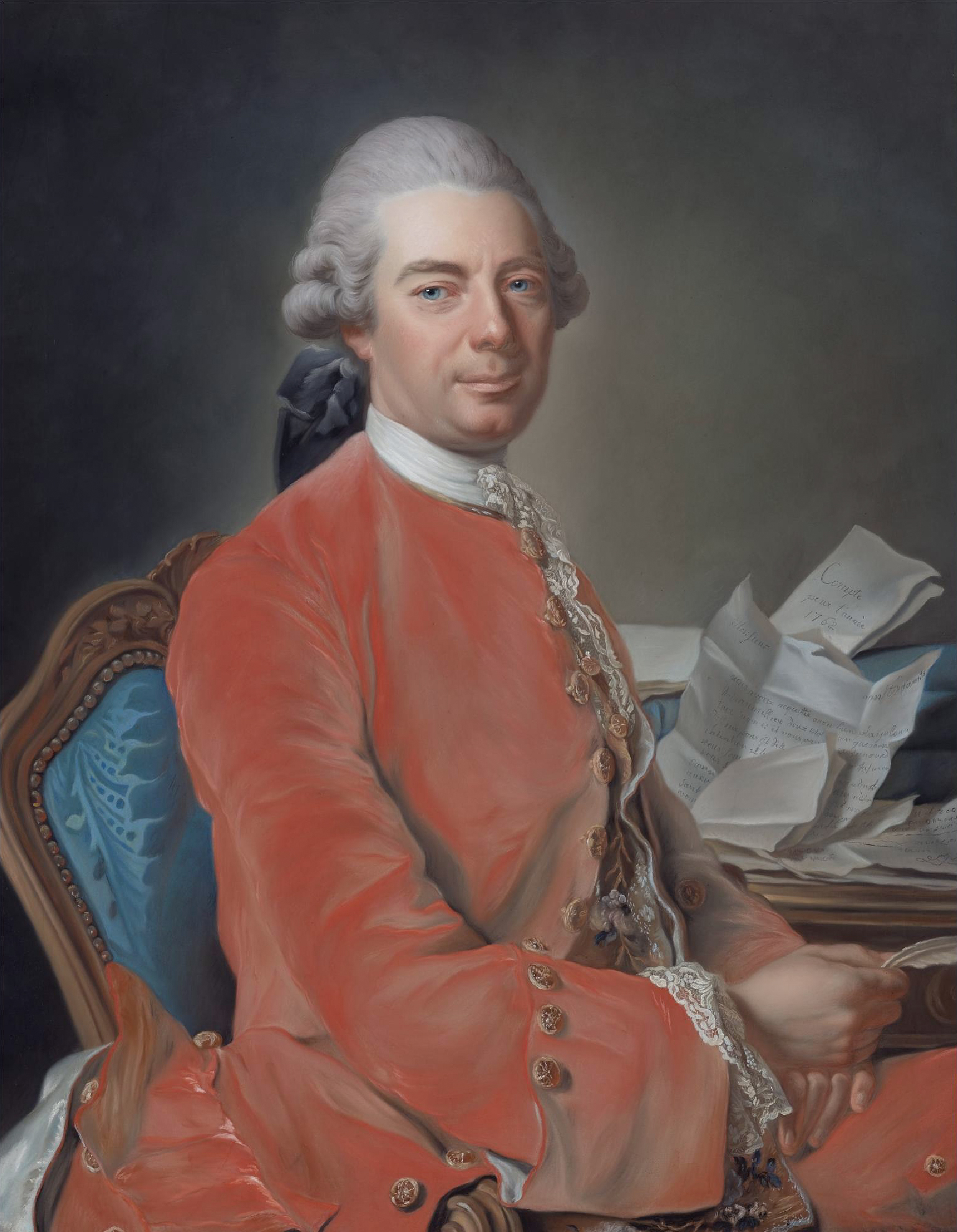
Johann Graf Fries (1718–1793)

- Johann von Fries (1719–1785): The counts of Fries were, with an interruption, from 1773 to 1902 owner of the Vöslau dominion and both historically and economically of greatest importance for the development of the place
- Ami Boué (1794–1881) came from an emigrated French Huguenot family, traveled all over Europe as a geologist and ethnologist between 1812 and 1839. He wrote nine essays about the Vöslau springs between 1841 and 1874. He is buried in a crypt in the Vöslau cemetery.
- Robert Schlumberger von Goldeck (1814–1879), promotor of wine growing, was the first in Austria to produce sparkling wine by the traditional method of Champagne wine region in his Vöslau winery
- Ferdinand Piatnik (1819–1885), Austrian-Hungarian card painter, manufacturer, philanthropist, founder of Piatnik & Söhne
- Jacob Levy Moreno (1889–1974) was a physician in the city between 1918 and 1925. He was the founder of sociometry, group psychotherapy and "psychodrama". He lived and worked in the house Maital 4. He emigrated to the US in 1925.
- Jean Aberbach (1910–1992), born in Bad Vöslau. With his brother Julian Aberbach, he founded the Hill and Range music publishing house, which was instrumental in the careers of Elvis Presley, Johnny Cash, Ray Charles, Edith Piaf and Jacques Brel.
- Hannelore Valencak (1929–2004) was an Austrian writer who lived until her death in Bad Vöslau.
- Arnulf Rainer (born 1929), Austrian painter, lived and worked 1953–59 in his family-owned villa in the city.
- Wolfgang Gratzer (born 1965 in Bad Vöslau), musicologist and book author. From 2010 to 2014 he was the Vice Rector for development and research of Mozarteum University Salzburg.
- Felix Auböck (born 1996 in Bad Vöslau), Austrian 2016 Olympic swimmer and european Champion.

== Economy and Traffic ==
=== Economy ===
The main sources of income in Bad Vöslau are tourism and wine-growing. Also, the Vöslauer mineral water from the thermal springs is bottled within the city limits and exported worldwide. On 11 February 2006 the new Bad Vöslau health resort was opened.

The area of the now defunct worsted factory has been refurbished by a group of investors and the premises are being let as storage, business, or office space under the name of Kammgarnzentrum (Worsted Centre). In the northeast of Bad Vöslau there are several shops and businesses.

=== Traffic ===
==== Road ====
The Bad Vöslauer Straße B212 runs through the centre of the city, connecting Bad Vöslau with Baden (north) and Berndorf (via Gainfarn and Großau, west). At Schlossplatz a branch road leads south to Kottingbrunn, Leobersdorf, and Wiener Neustadt.

Just east of the city is the Süd Autobahn. There is a junction leading to Bad Vöslau. The southern parts of town, however, can also easily be reached via the Kottingbrunn junction.

==== Rail and Public Transport ====
Bad Vöslau railway station is located in the east of the city, on the line of the Südbahn (Southern Railway). The station is served by local and regional trains. In front of the station building, public buses depart for various places in town and in the vicinity.

==== Air ====
Near the eastern limits of town (and, for the larger part, in the municipality of Kottingbrunn) lies Vöslau Airfield. It is a private airfield, without commercial traffic. It was noted as the place where on 15 April 1955 an Austrian government delegation headed by Federal Chancellor Julius Raab landed after returning from successful peace treaty negotiations with Soviet Union leaders in Moscow.

== Images ==
=== Bad Vöslau ===
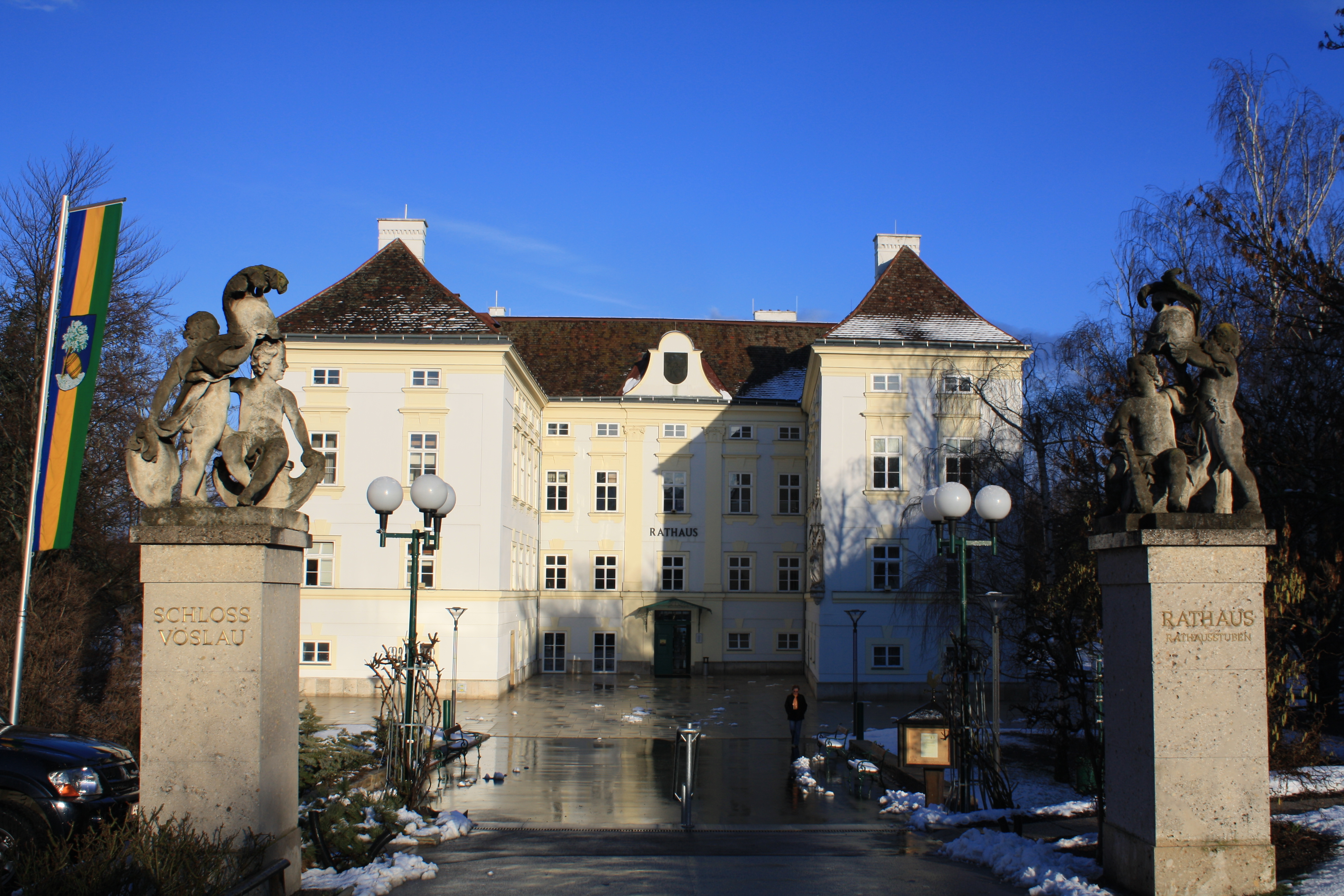
Vöslau castle, now the town hall

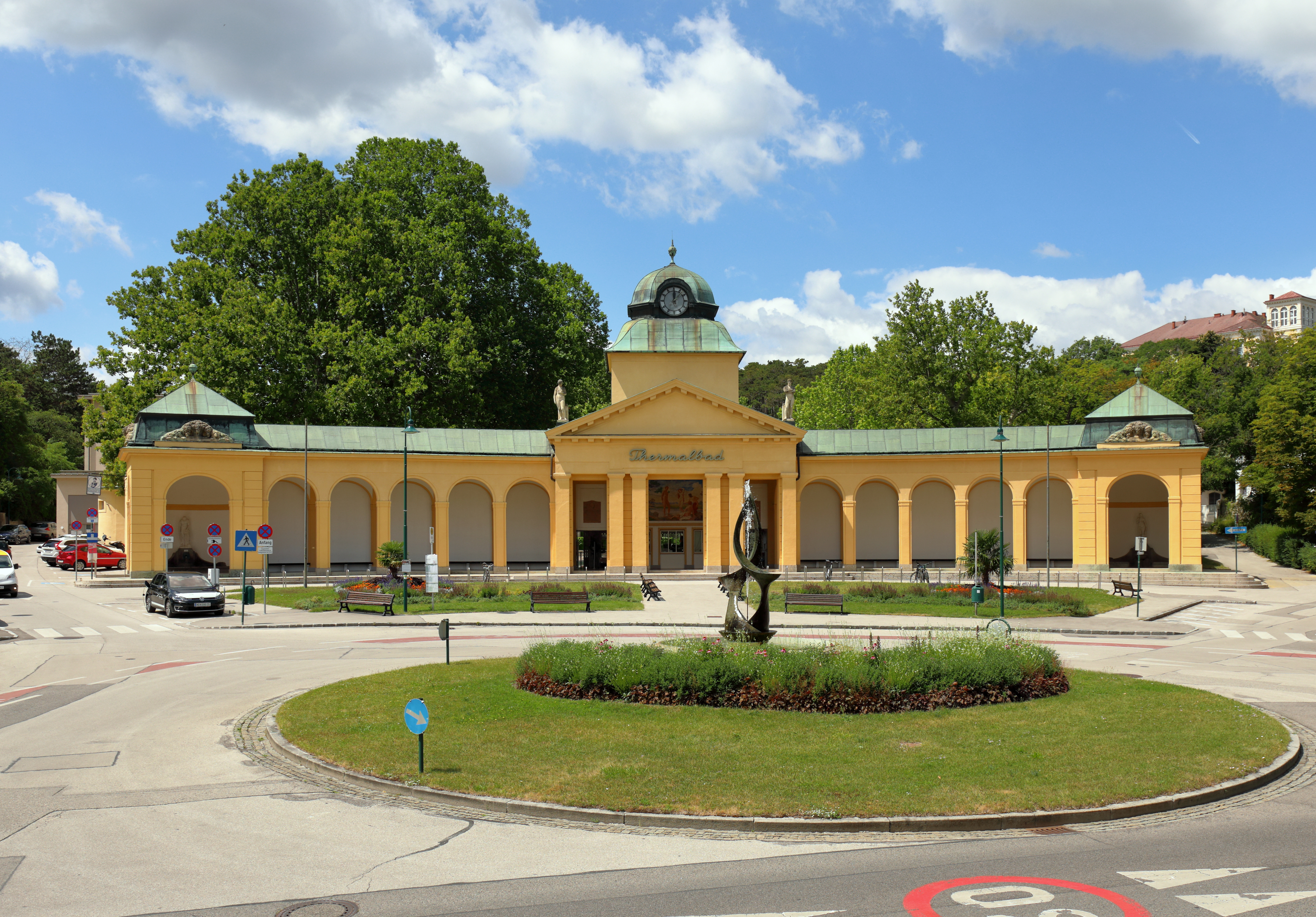
Public swimming bath (Thermalbad)

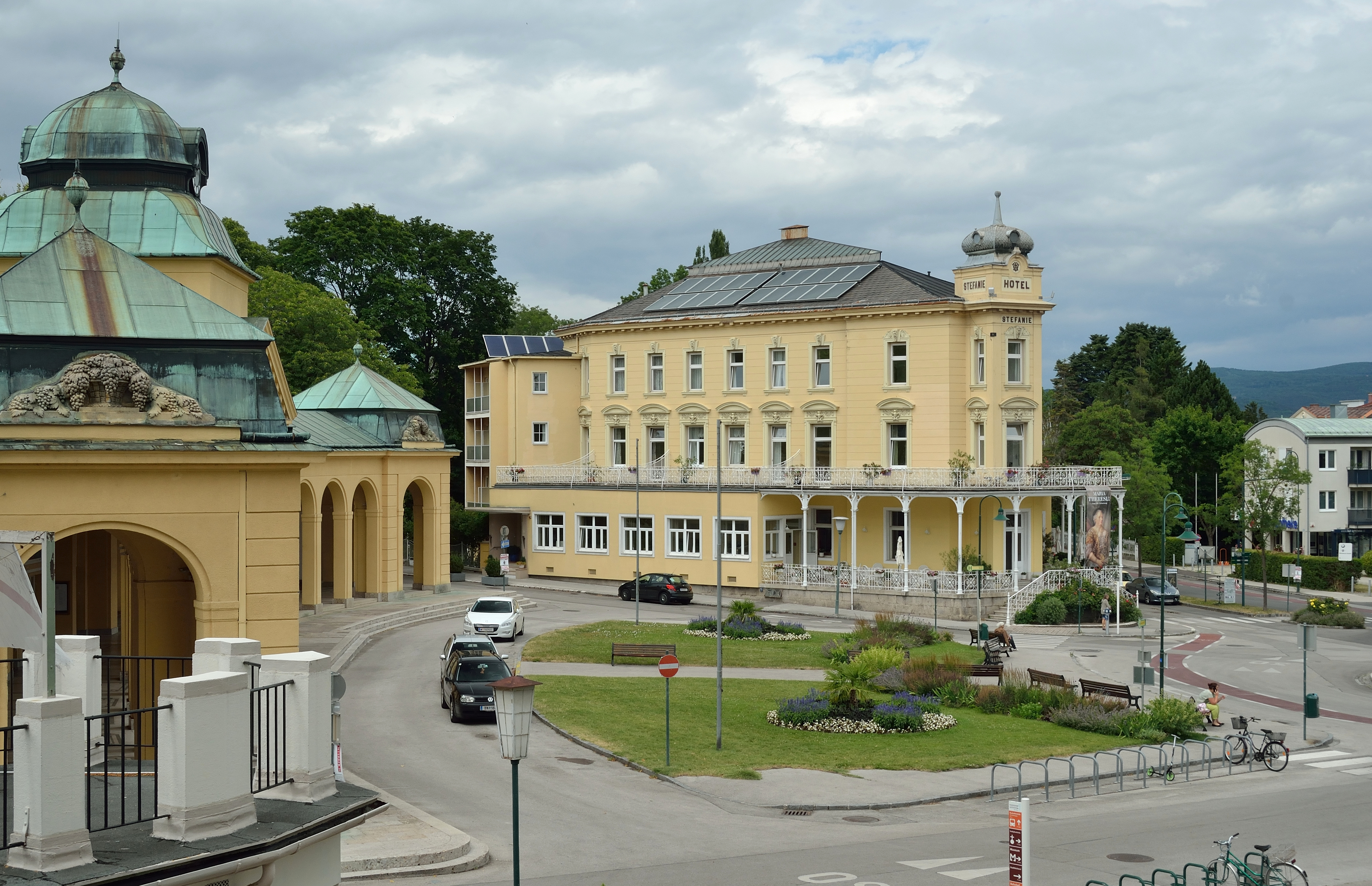
Hotel Stefanie

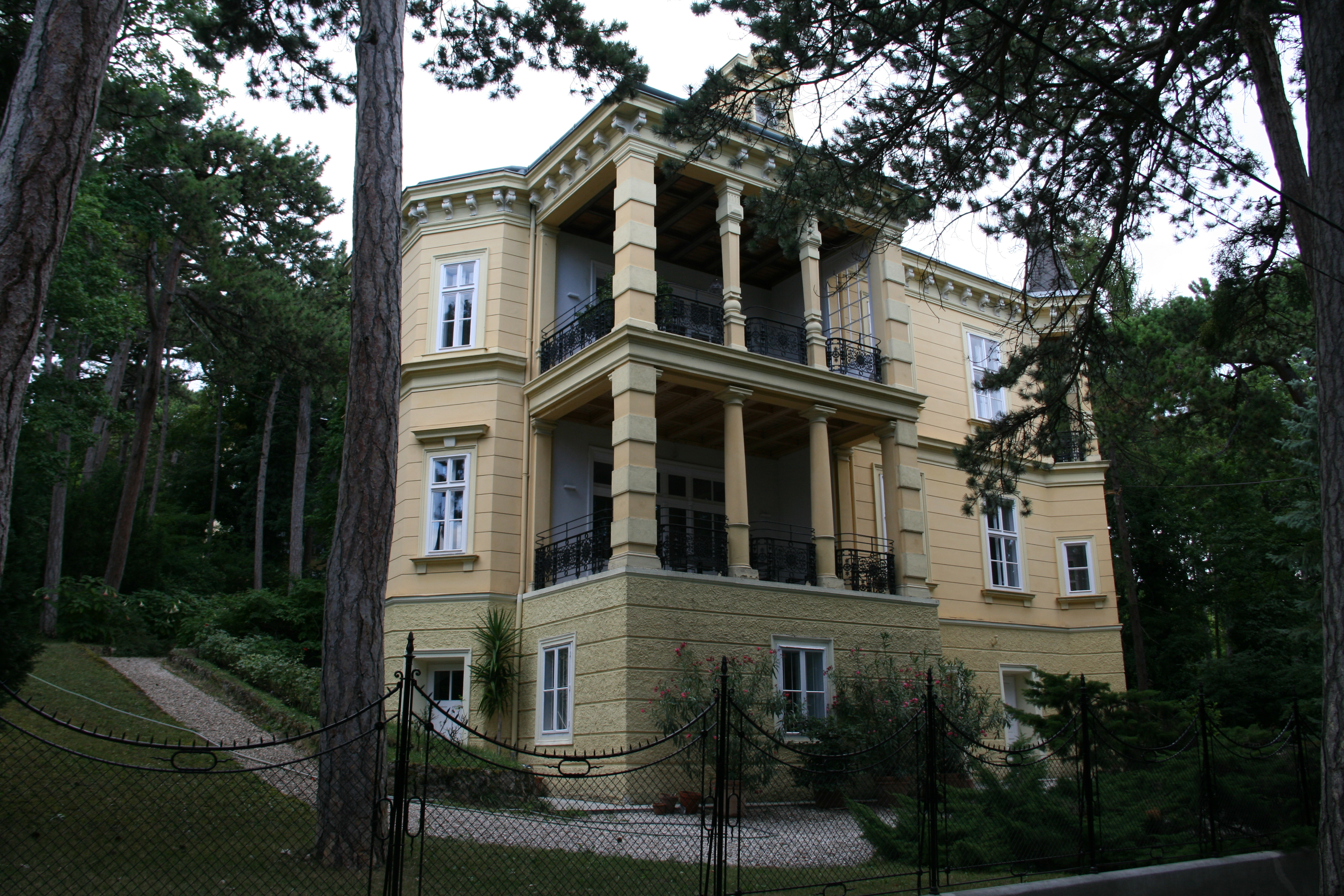
Villa "Waldhäuser Ernst Ledere", by architects Fellner & Helmer

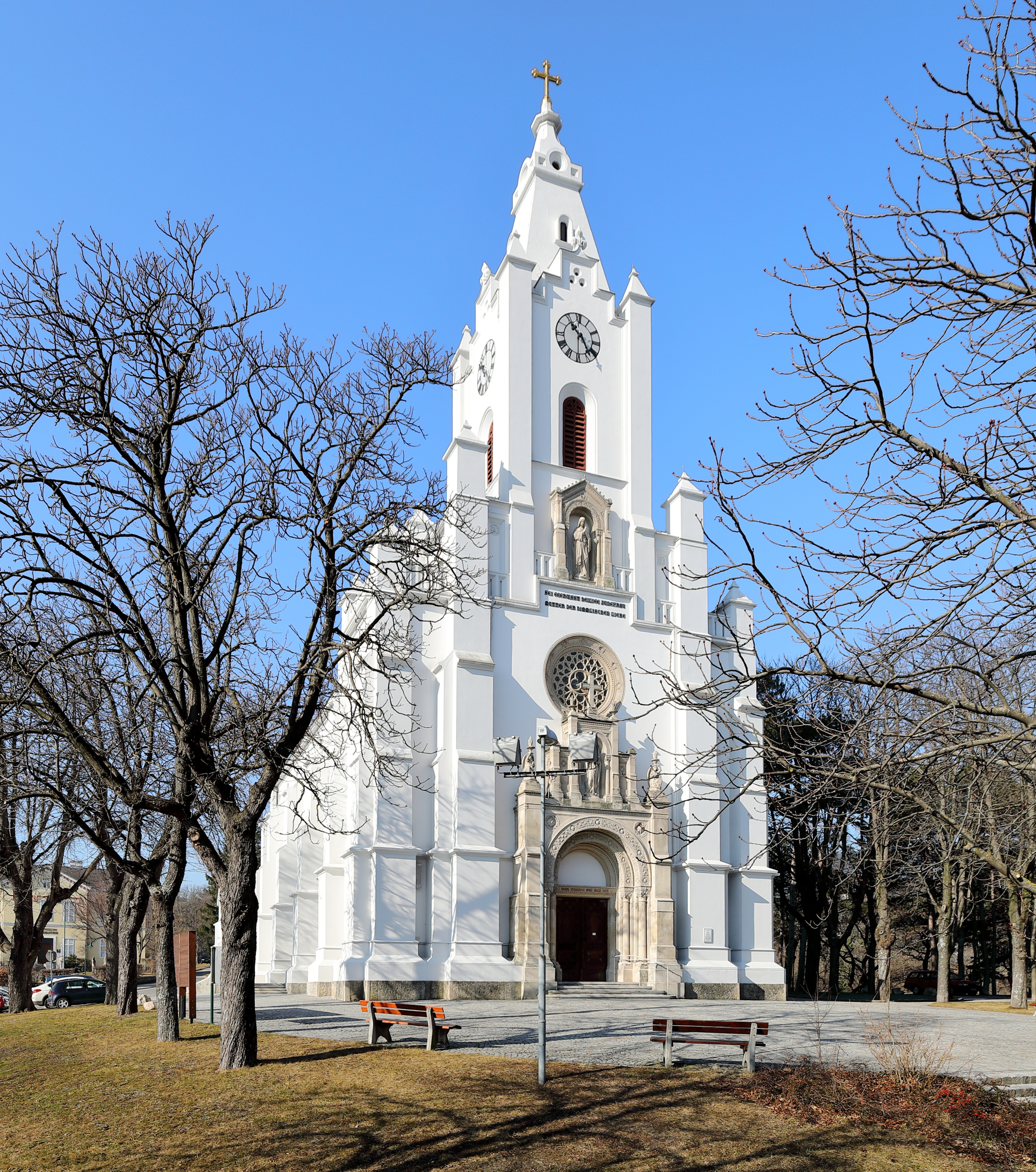
James the Great parish church

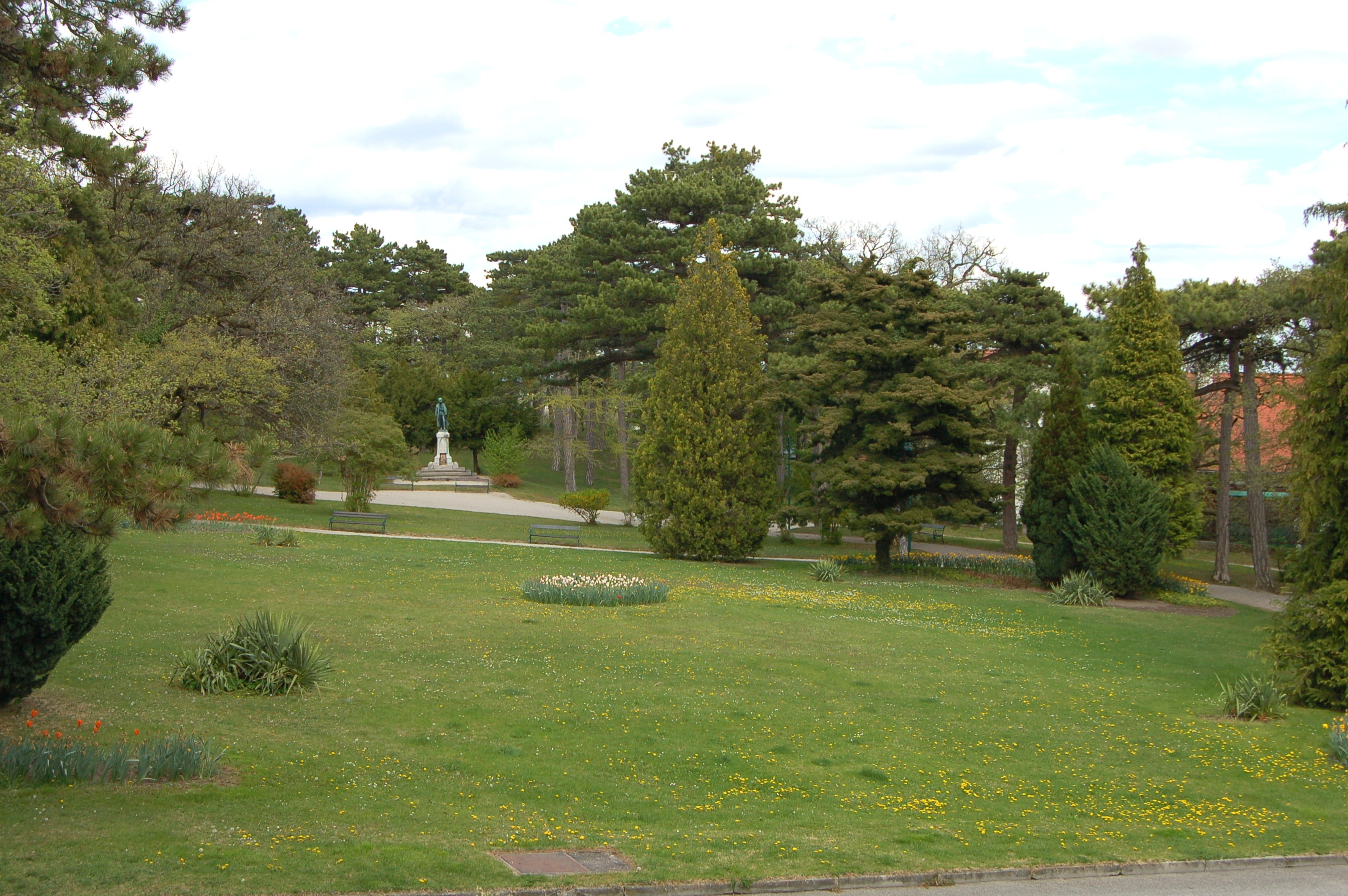
Spa gardens

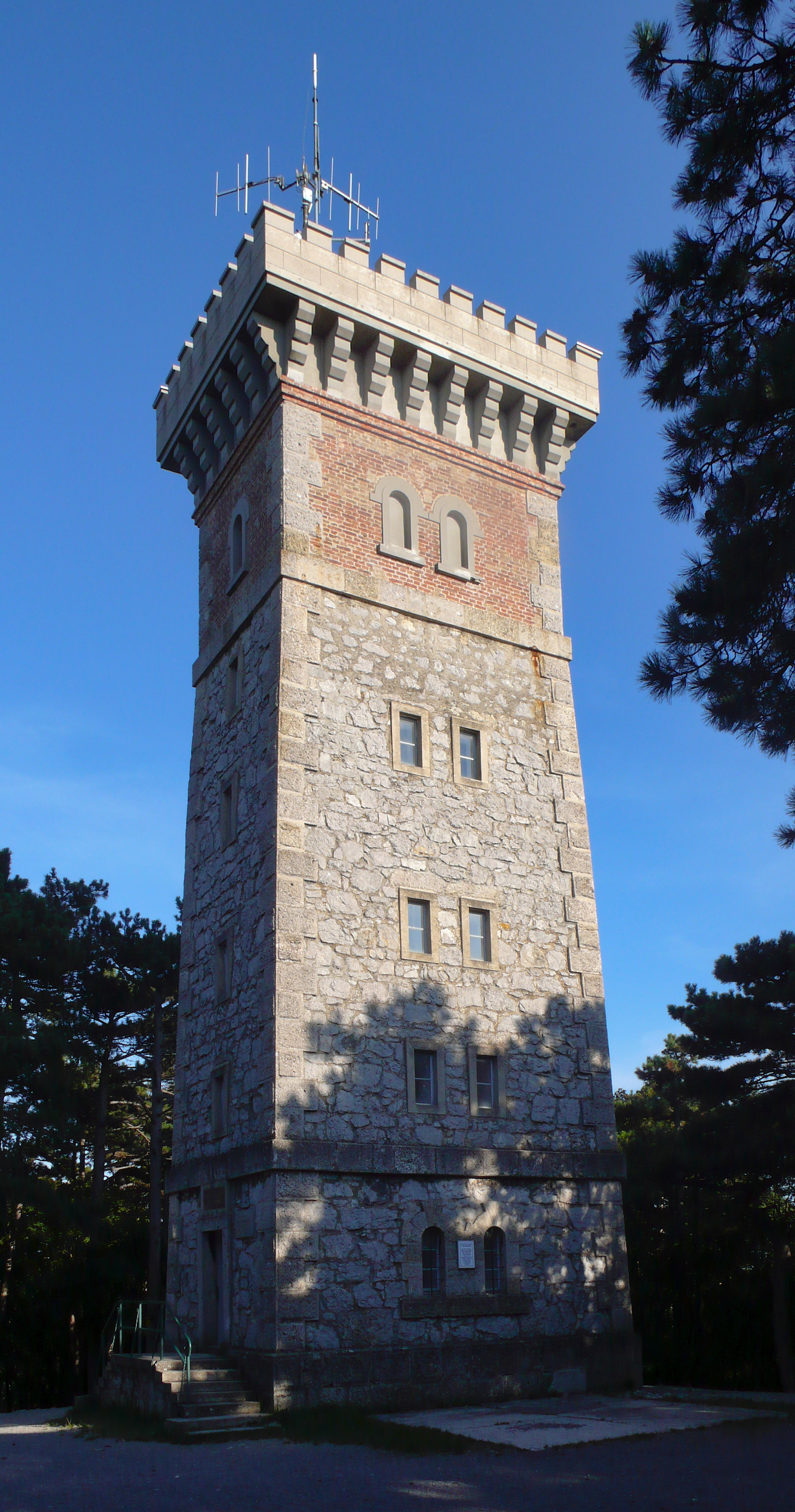
"Harzbergturm" lookout

=== Gainfarn ===
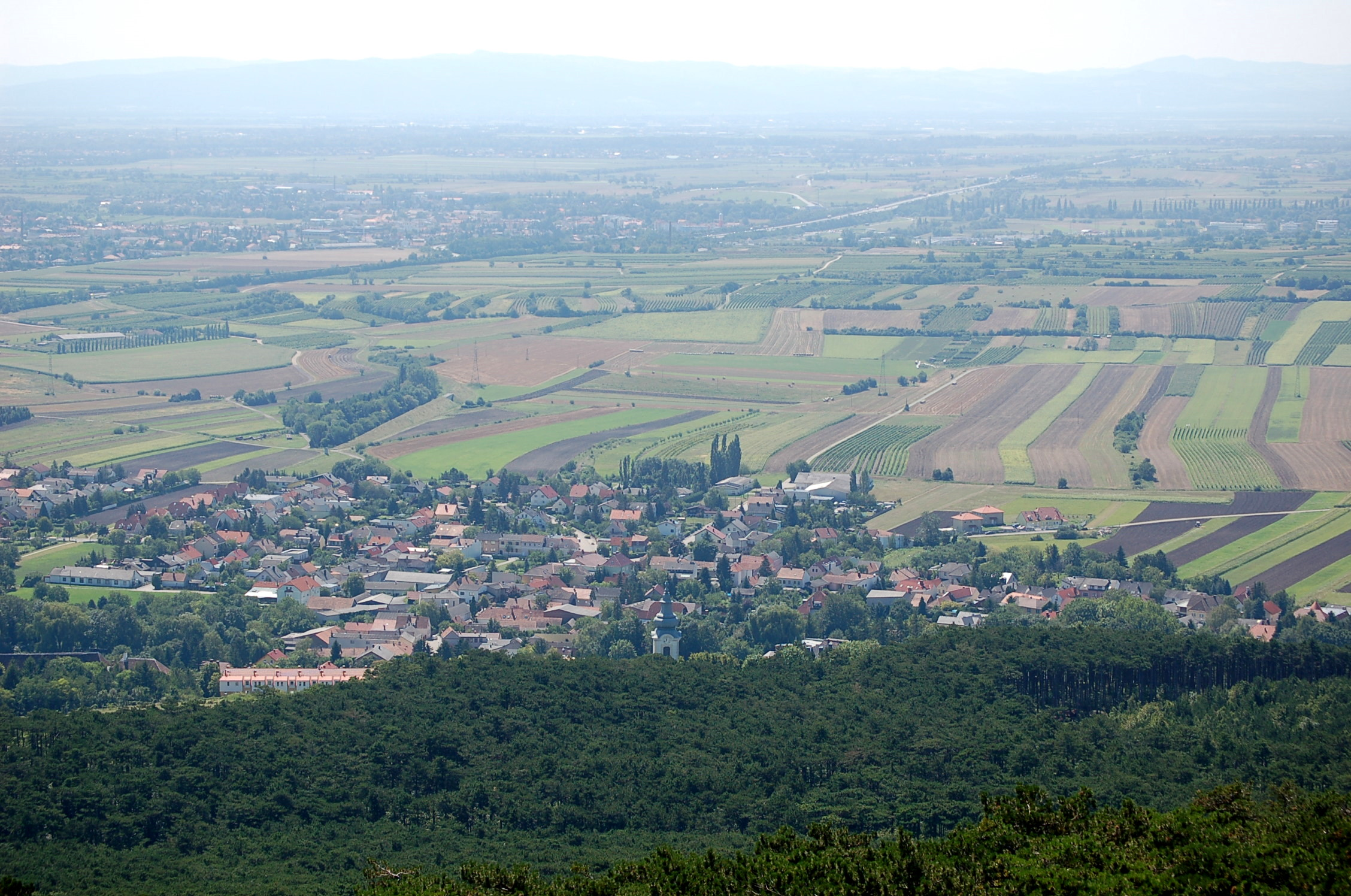
View of Gainfarn from Harzberg

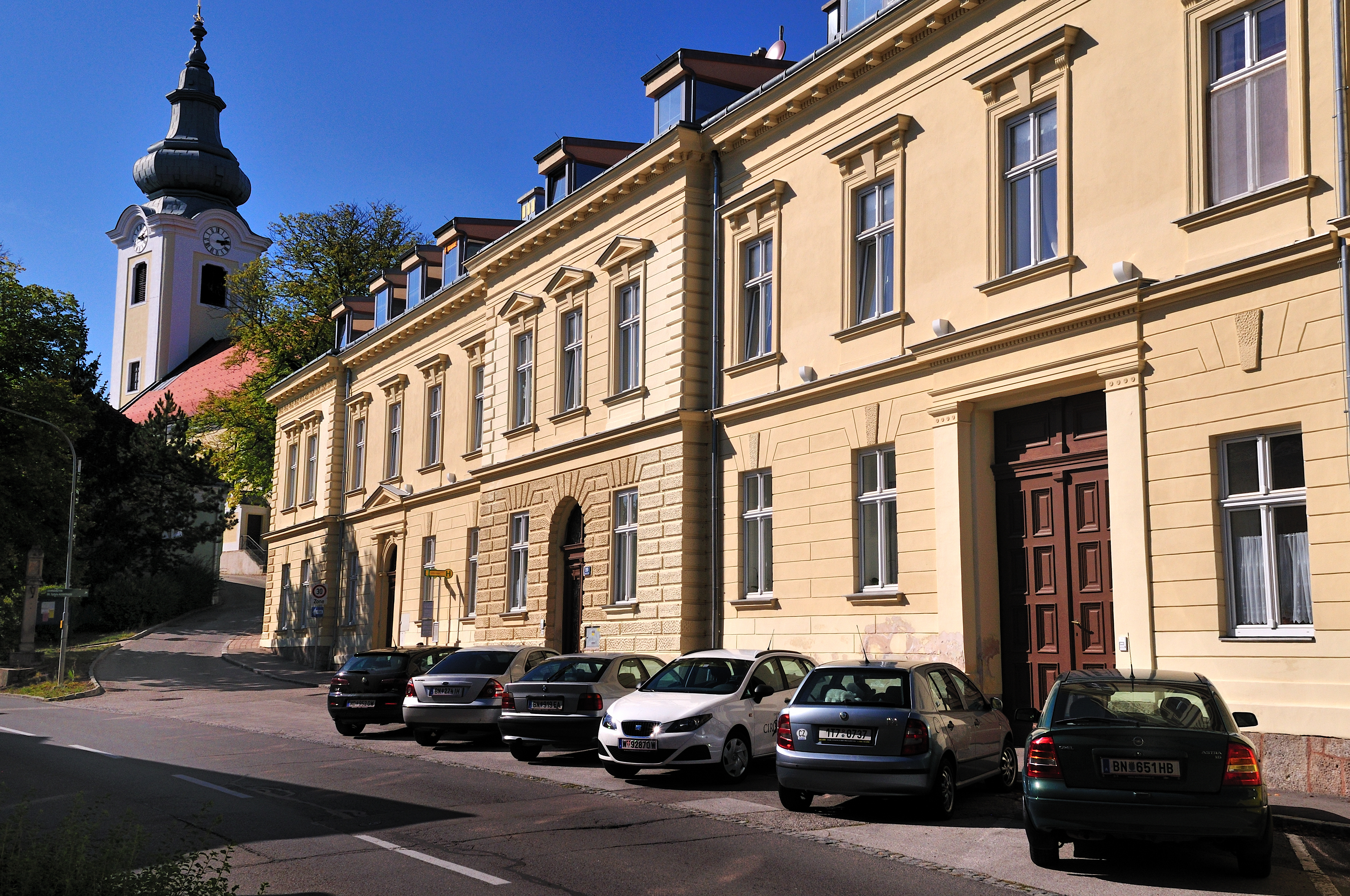
Main street

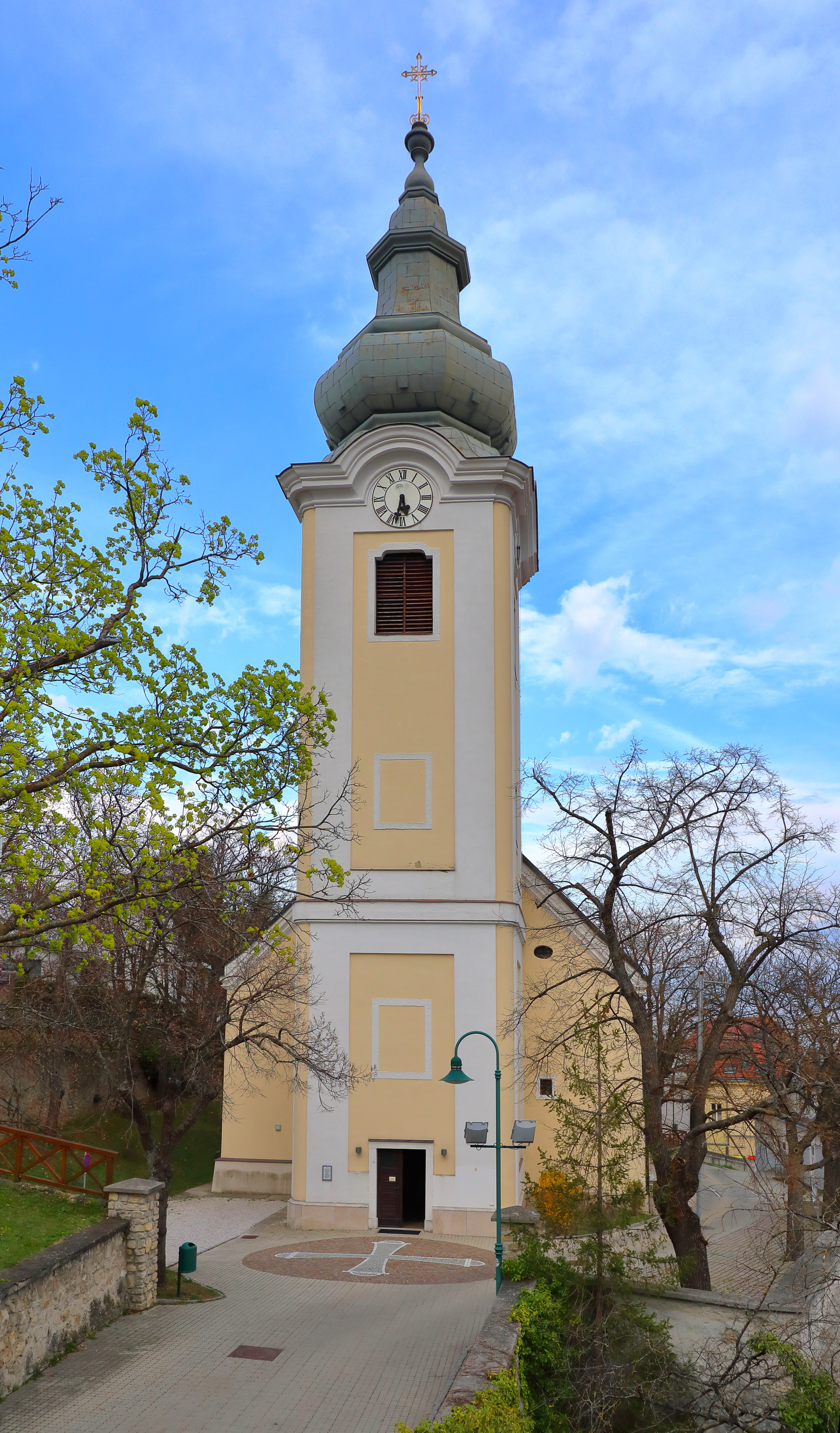
John the Baptist parish church

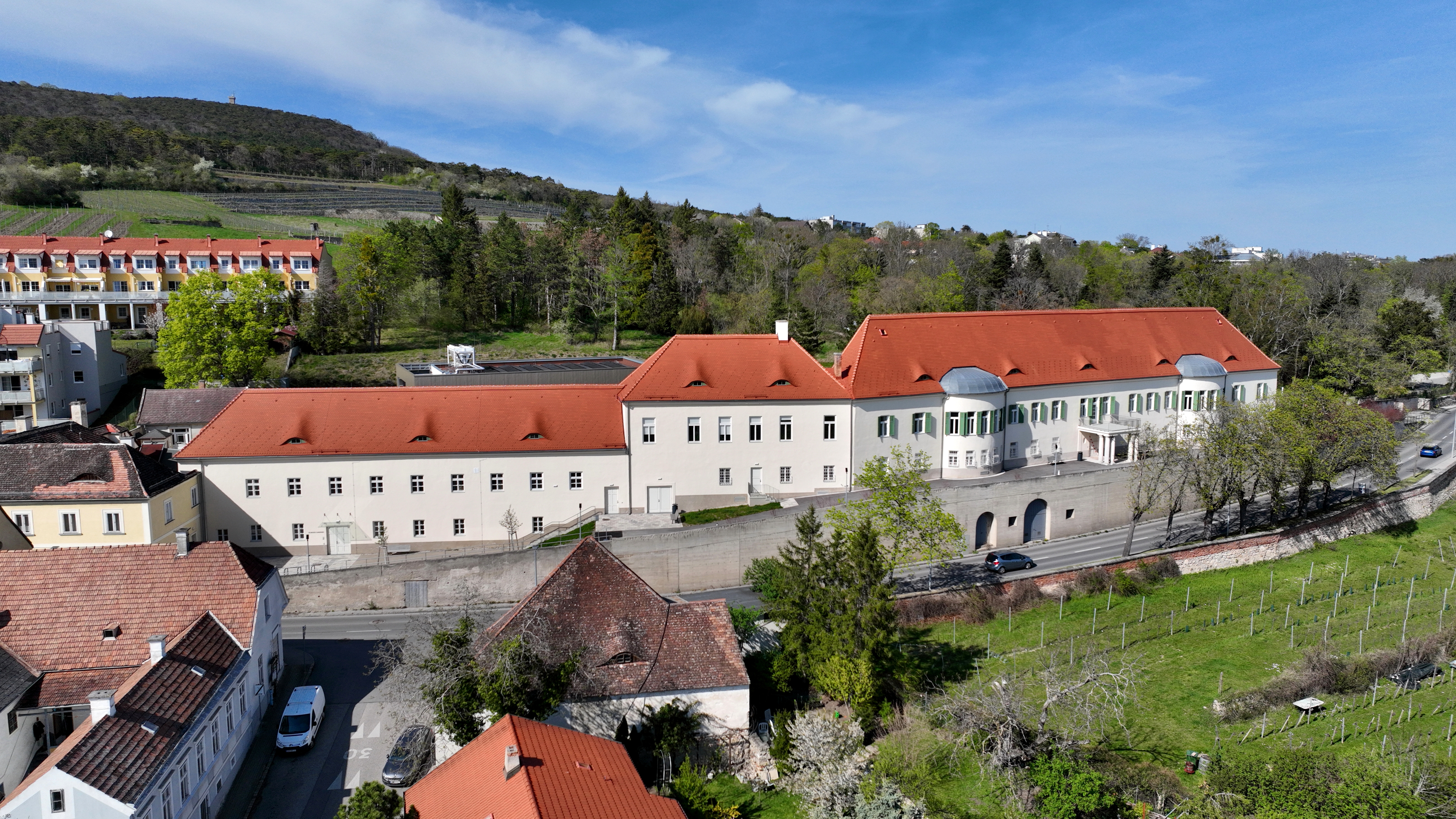
Gainfarn palace

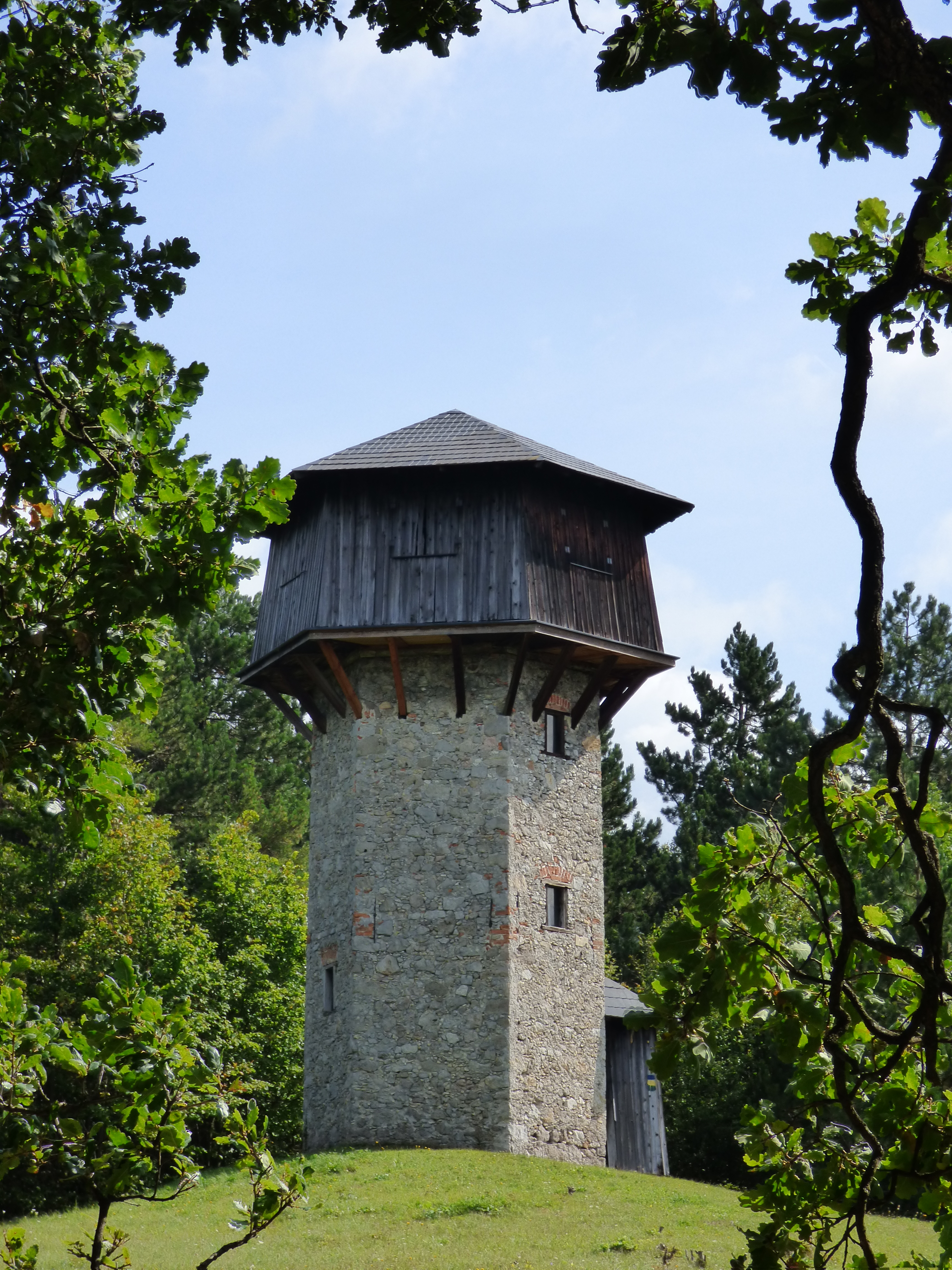
Merkenstein lookout

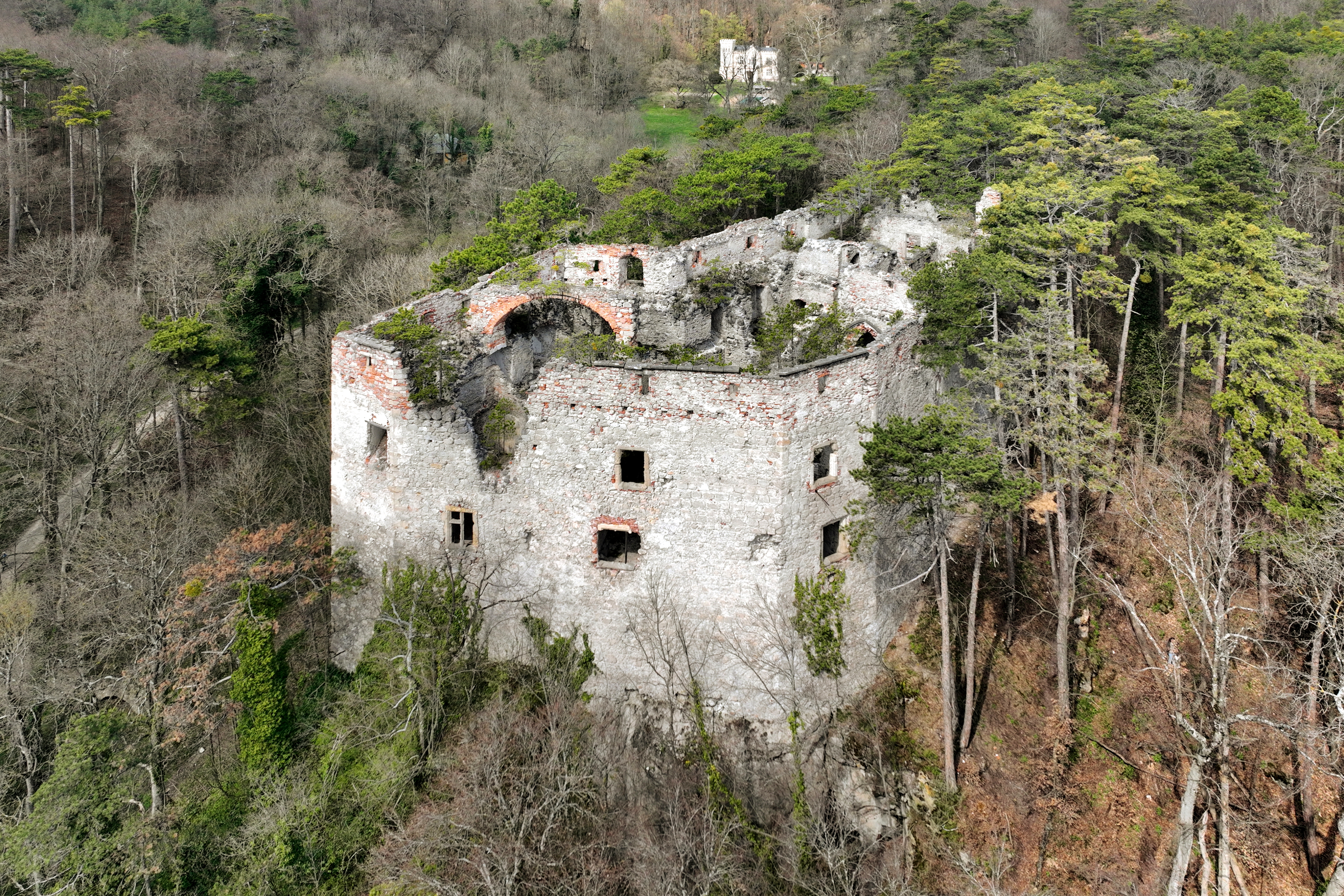
Aerial view of Merkenstein ruins

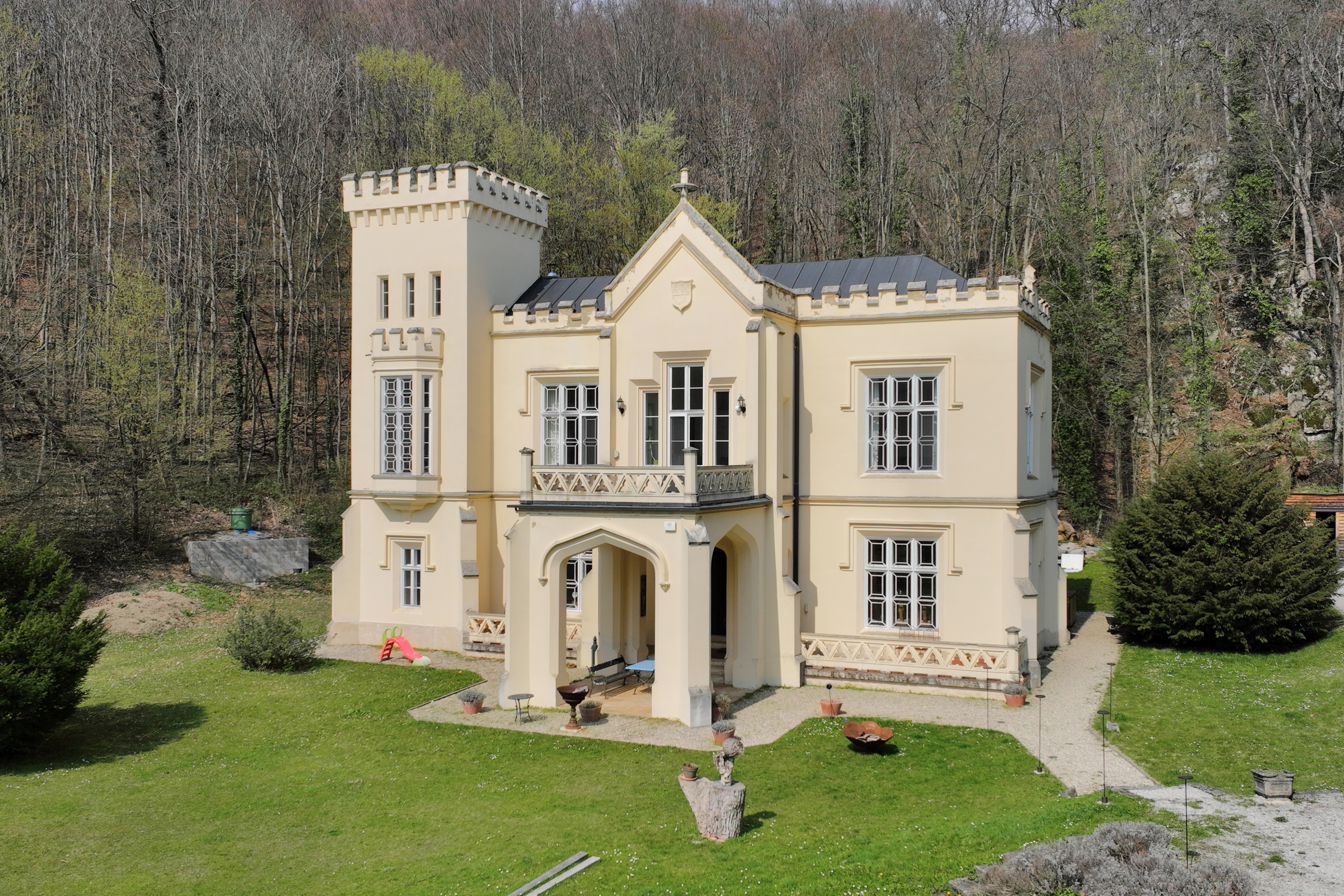
Merkenstein palace

=== Großau ===
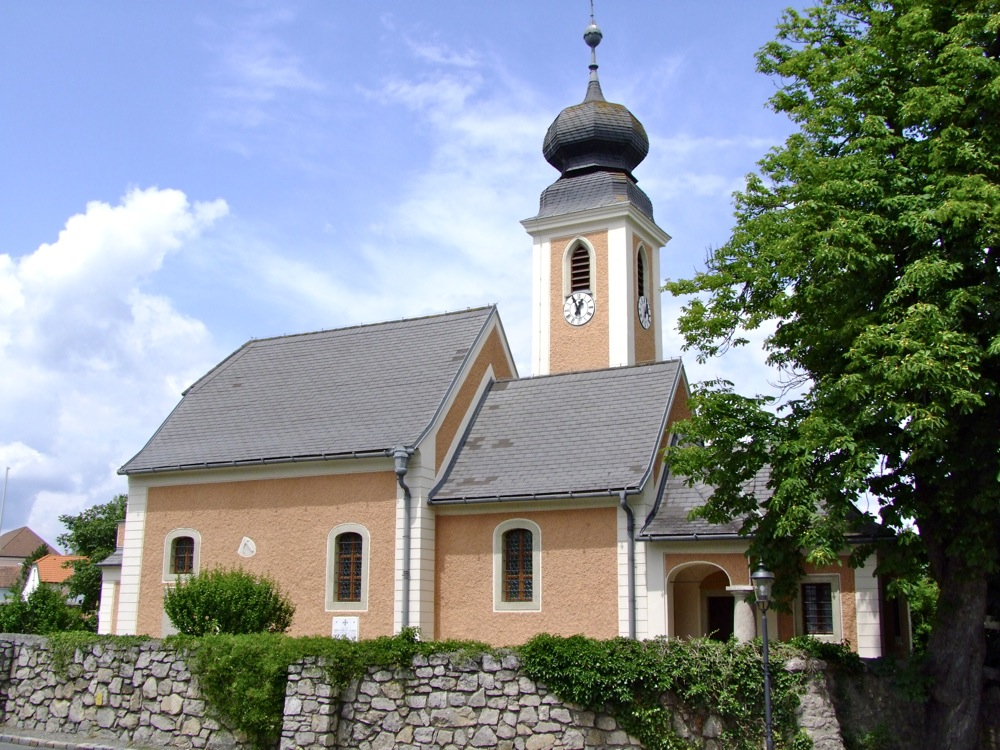
Catherine of Alexandria church

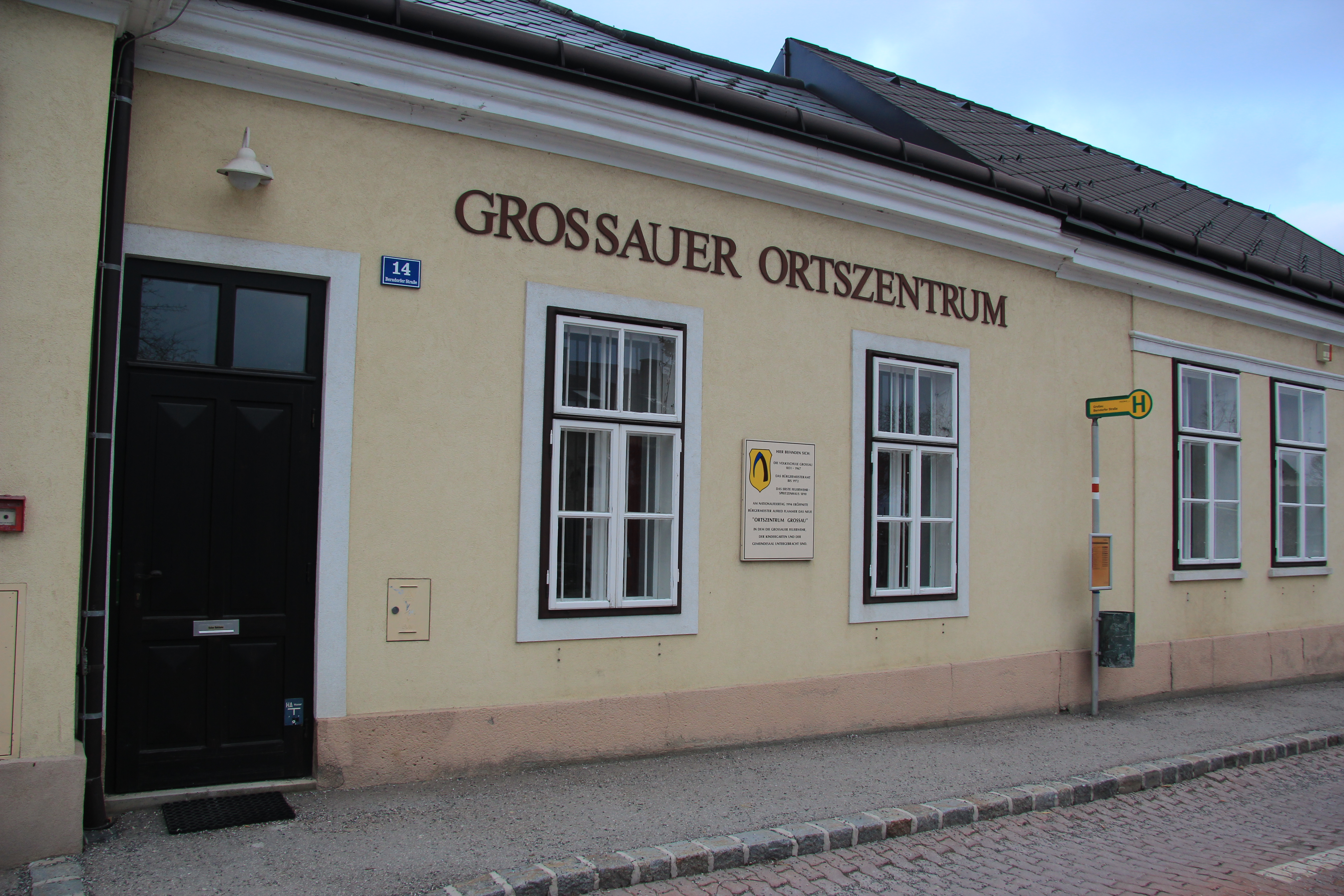
"Ortszentrum Grossau" community centre building, housing the fire station, a kindergarten, and a community function room
