= Robert Schlumberger von Goldeck =

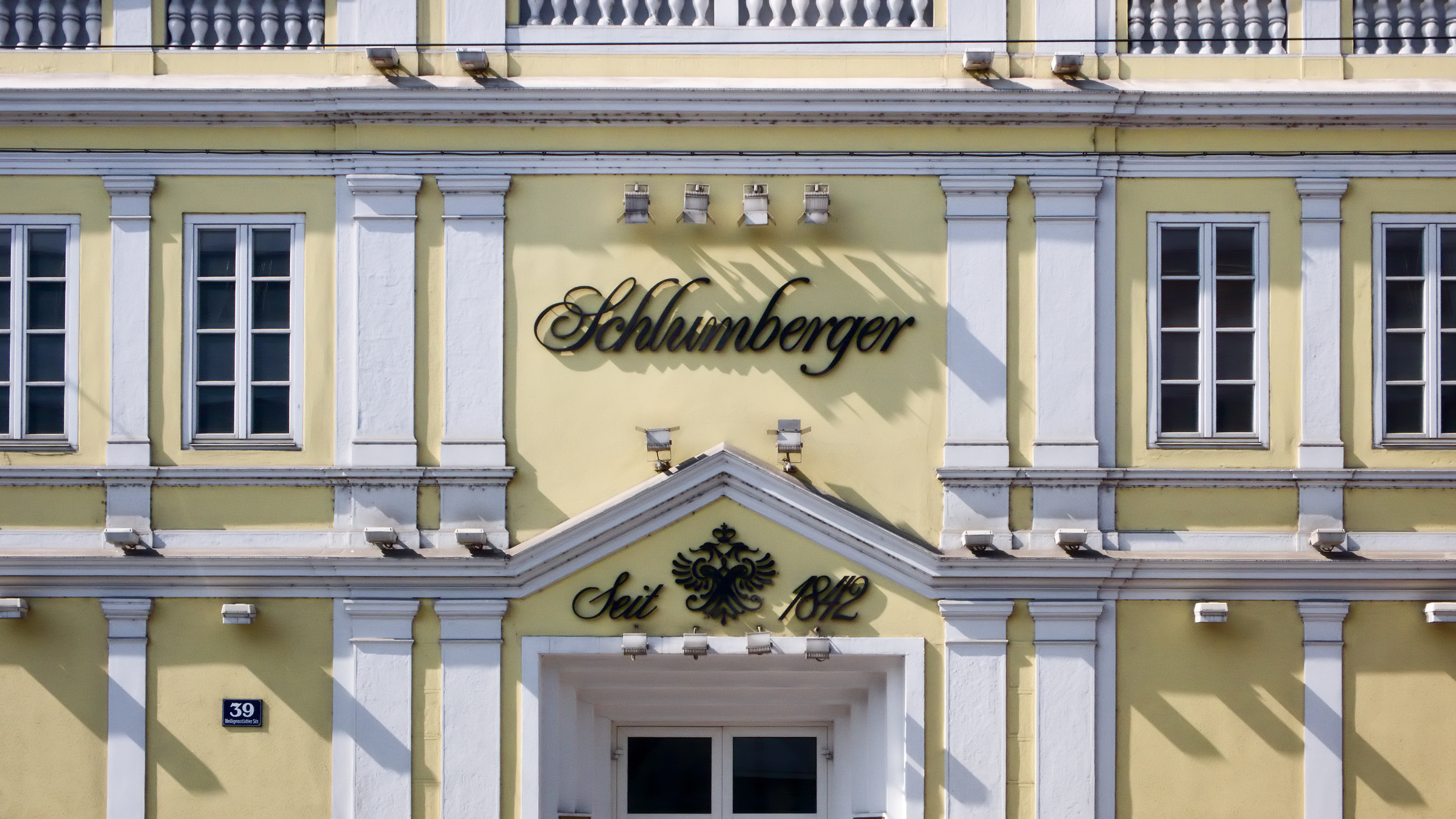
Facade of Schlumberger champagne cellars, Vienna-Döbling

Robert Alwin Schlumberger, Edler von Goldeck (12 September 1814 - 13 July 1879) was an entrepreneur and the first producer of sparkling wine (German: Sekt) in Austria.

== Life ==
Schlumberger was born in Stuttgart in the German Kingdom of Württemberg. Upon the early death of his father, he began a commercial apprenticeship. As director of Ruinart, one of the leading champagne houses in Reims, France, he was experienced with the méthode champenoise. In 1841, on a boat trip he met his future wife Sophie Kirchner from Vienna, the daughter of a wealthy factory owner. He had the idea to produce champagne-like wine (Schaumwein) in Austria using the French method but Austrian grapes.

In 1842, Schlumberger founded his company renting several vineyards in Vöslau, a small Lower Austrian town south of Vienna situated in the present-day Thermenregion wine-growing area of the eastern Vienna Woods. His alliance which Sophie Kirchner, whom he married in the following year, helped him finance his business venture. Schlumberger presented his first sparkling wine in 1846 under the name Vöslauer weißer Schaumwein (White sparkling wine of Vöslau), from 1859 under Vöslauer Goldeck, the first protected wine trademark in Austria. It was produced from red Blauer Portugieser grapes growing in the Goldeck vineyards in Vöslau, which Schlumberger bought in 1843, and the sparkling wine was an immediate success.

Schlumberger wines were on board of the SMS Novara on its around-the-world mission 1857-1859. The company opened branch stores in Berlin and after the 1862 International Exhibition also in London, where the wine was sold under the brand name "Vöslauer Sparkling". Robert Schlumberger also served as Vöslau mayor from 1864 to 1870. In 1878, one year before his death, he was ennobled by Emperor Franz Joseph I of Austria as "Edler von Goldeck". He died in Vöslau, aged 64.

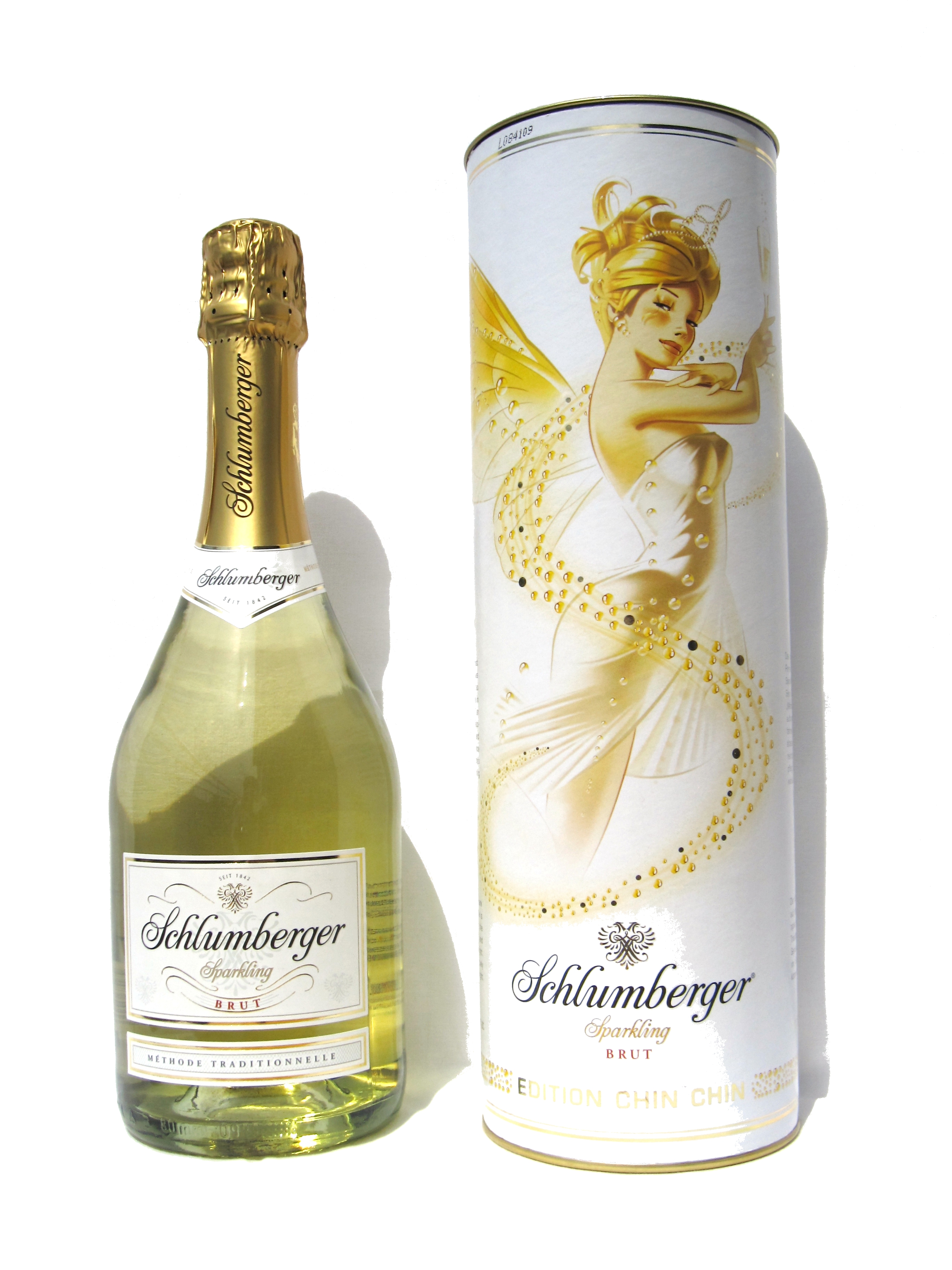
Schlumberger Sparkling Brut

== Schlumberger Sekt company ==
Schlumberger's son and heir Otto received the title of a K.u.k. Hoflieferant in 1895. The company survived the dissolution of the Austro-Hungarian Monarchy in 1918 and up to today, Schlumberger Wein- und Sektkellerei GmbH with its seat at Vienna-Döbling is one of the leading producers of sparkling wine in Austria. In 1973, it was taken over by the German Underberg company.

- Grape Varieties: Cabernet Sauvignon (Red), Merlot (Red), Cabernet Franc (Red)
- Specific Vineyards: Goldeck, Hupfenberg, Oberkirchen

== Quotes ==
Bjørnstjerne Bjørnson (1832–1910) in a letter to his daughter Bergliot from Schwaz in Tyrol, 29 May 1894:

We drank Vöslauer Schaumwein, and maybe it was time place and mood that made a difference, but the best Champagne does not suit me like this one.

Vöslauer wine is also mentioned by John Galsworthy (1867–1933) in his 1926 play Escape as well as in the 1957 volume of novellas Fin de siècle by Paul Morand (1888–1976).
