= Brazda =

Brazda or Brázda (Czech and Slovak feminine: Brázdová) may refer to:

== People ==
- Amelie Posse-Brázdová (1884–1957), Swedish author
- Bozidar Brazda (born 1972), Canadian artist
- Dalibor Brazda (1921–2005), Czech/Swiss music composer, arranger, and conductor
- Oskar Brázda (1887–1977), Czech painter and artist
- Pavel Brázda (1926–2017), Czech painter
- Rudolf Brazda (1913–2011), one of the last known survivors of homosexual deportation (Buchenwald concentration camp)
- Soňa Brázdová (born 1953), Czech gymnast
- Tia Brazda, Canadian singer

== Places ==
- Brázda (cave), a cave in the Slovak Karst mountains in Slovakia
- Brazda, Čučer-Sandevo, a village in North Macedonia
  - Stenkovec Brazda Airfield
- Brazda lui Novac, Roman limes in present-day Romania, known also as Constantine Wall

== See also ==
- Brózda (Polish form)
