= I-War =

I-War may also refer to:

- I-War (1995 video game), a shoot 'em up video game
- I-War (1997 video game), a space combat simulator video game
- iWar, the term used by NATO to describe a form of Internet-based warfare
- Iwar, the Old Norwegian form of Eihwaz

== People ==
- Iwar Donnér, Swedish artist
- Tay Iwar, Nigerian singer
- Iwar von Lücken, German poet
- Iwar Wiklander, Swedish actor
