= Bjerre =

Bjerre is a Danish surname. Notable people with the surname include:

- Andreas Bjerre (1879–1925), Swedish academic
- Anna Bjerre (born 1998), Danish politician
- Jens Bjerre (disambiguation), multiple people
- Jonas Bjerre (born 1976), Danish musician
- Jonas Buhl Bjerre (born 2004), Danish chess master
- Kenneth Bjerre (born 1984), Danish motorcycle speedway rider
- Kresten Bjerre (1946–2014), Danish footballer
- Lasse Bjerre (born 1993), Danish motorcycle speedway rider
- Morten Bjerre (born 1972), Danish handball player
- Poul Bjerre (1876–1964), Swedish psychiatrist
- Sys Bjerre (born 1985), Danish singer-songwriter
- Frederik Bjerre (born 2000), Danish handball player
