= List of airports in North Macedonia =

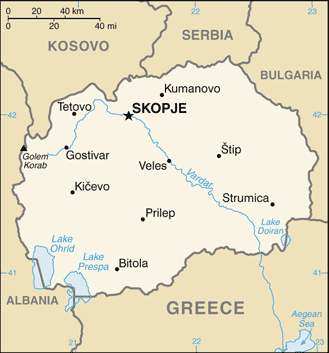
Map of North Macedonia

This is a list of airports in North Macedonia, grouped by type and sorted by location.

== Airports ==
Airport names shown in bold indicate the facility has scheduled passenger service on commercial airlines.

Location	ICAO	IATA	DAFIF	Airport name
**International airports**				
Ohrid	LWOH	OHD		**Ohrid "St. Paul the Apostle" Airport**
Skopje	LWSK	SKP		**Skopje International Airport**
**Sport airfields**				
Bitola	LWBT		LW74	Logovardi Airport
Kumanovo	LWKU		LW67	Adzi Tepe Airport
Prilep	LWPP		LW66	Malo Konjari Airport
Skopje	LWSN		LW75	Stenkovec Airport
Štip	LWST		LW73	Sushevo Airfield
**Airports for industrial aviation**				
Bitola			LW68	Srpci Airport
Dolneni			LW69	Sarandinovo Airport
Negotino			LW72	Negotino Airport
Rosoman			N/A	Gradsko Airport
Sveti Nikole			LW76	Mavrovica Airport
Sveti Nikole			LW71	Pesirovo Airport
Veles			LW70	Karatmanovo Airport
Štip			N/A	Krivi Dol Airport
**Auxiliary runways**				
Kocani			N/A	Auxiliary runway Ponikva
Štip			N/A	Auxiliary runway Plackovica
**Unscheduled**				
Tetovo			N/A	Airport Tetovo

== See also ==
- Transport in North Macedonia
- List of airports by ICAO code: L#LW – North Macedonia
- Wikipedia: WikiProject Aviation/Airline destination lists: Europe#North Macedonia
