= Carl Busch =

Danish-born American composer and music teacher

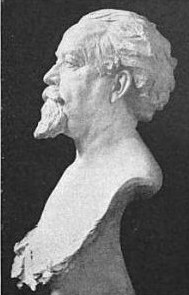
- Jorgen Dreyer's bust of Carl Busch
- Born: 29 March 1862; Bjerre, Denmark
- Died: 19 December 1943 (aged 81); Kansas City, Missouri, USA

Carl Busch (29 March 1862 – 19 December 1943) was a Danish-American composer, conductor, and music educator. He was the founding conductor the original Kansas City Symphony Orchestra, taught at the Kansas City–Horner Conservatory, was among the founding faculty of the University of Kansas City, and contributed to the founding of the Kansas City Philharmonic. Several of his compositions were associated with the Indianist movement. His students included Florence Price, William Dawson, and Robert Russell Bennett.

== Life and career ==
=== Early life ===
Carl Busch was born in Bjerre, Denmark to George Ludwig Busch, a lawyer, and Ida Busch. Busch was the youngest of five children. He learned to play the violin, piano, flute, and cello. He first attended the University of Copenhagen before enrolling at the Royal Danish Academy of Music in Copenhagen, where he studied with Niels Wilhelm Gade and Johan Peter Emilius Hartmann, and worked under Johan Svendsen. Busch received a scholarship in 1885 to study at the Royal Conservatory of Brussels, where he also played with the Brussels Symphony Orchestra. In 1886, he left for Paris, where he played with Benjamin Godard's orchestra and became acquainted with Charles Gounod and Camille Saint-Saëns.

=== Kansas City ===
In 1886, the Danish vice-consul in Kansas City and former music publisher Thyge Skogaard attempted to recruit a string quartet to take up residence in Kansas City. After losing an opportunity for an engagement Spain in the summer of 1886, Busch formed the Gade Quartet with other members of the Danish Royal Opera House Orchestra to accept Skogaard’s proposal. While the quartet gave numerous concerts, as most performances were unpaid or underpaid, it disbanded months later. Busch conducted the Philharmonic Choral Society of Kansas City, and later became the founding music director of the original Kansas City Symphony Orchestra in 1911. While the Symphony disbanded in 1918, Busch remained active as a composer and continued to guest conduct.

=== Teaching ===
Busch established a private studio at the historic Studio Building on the corner of Ninth and Locust streets and taught violin, theory, and composition. Among his private students were, notably, William Dawson, Leith Stevens, and Robert Russell Bennett, who dedicated his first symphony to Busch. Busch later taught at the Kansas City—Horner Conservatory, and was one of the first faculty members of the University of Kansas City. He also held summer teaching positions at Chicago Musical College, Brigham Young University, University of Notre Dame, and the Interlochen Center for the Arts. In Chicago, Busch taught Florence Price in the summer of 1926.

=== Personal life ===
Busch married pianist Sallie Saltenstall Simpson Smith on December 27, 1888. After their marriage, Sallie Smith Busch went on to study at Leipzig Conservatory with Carl Reinecke for four years, later returning to Kansas City where she established a reputation as a concert pianist and piano teacher. Since 1918, Busch spent many summer months in Cape Cod, the Ozarks, and Battle Creek, Michigan. In his later years, Busch mainly visited Battle Creek as a guest of one of his former pupils, who provided him with a cabin where he composed.

=== Later years and death ===
Sallie Smith Busch died in 1939. Busch died in Kansas City in 1943.

== Music ==
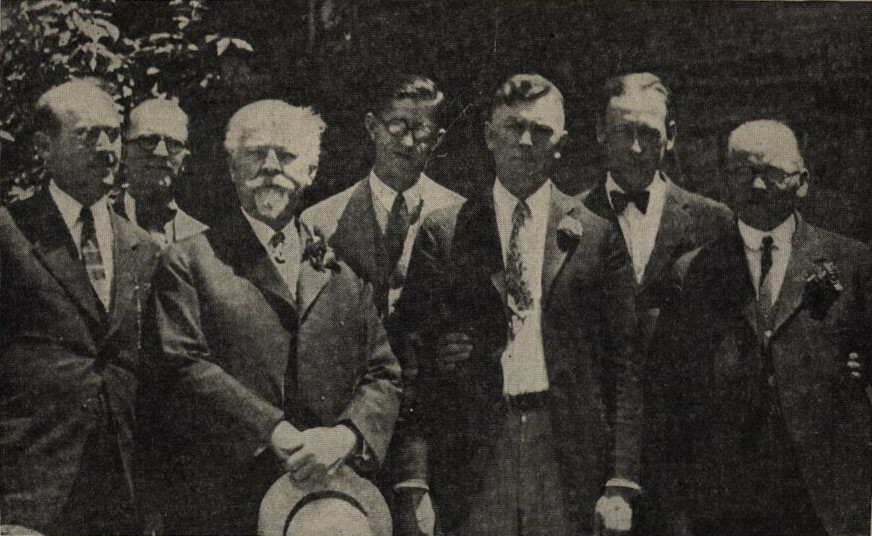
Busch (third from left) in 1927 on a visit to teach during the summer term at Brigham Young University. William F. Hanson (far left) was another composer to adopt Native American elements in his music.

Busch was especially noted for his works based on themes from the Western United States, and he would frequently incorporate American Indian themes into his music. He set many tribal songs as solos, and reworked some into larger pieces such as the Four Indian Tribal Melodies for string orchestra, based upon the music of the Omaha and Chippewa. Other works, such as A Chant from the Great Plains for band, are more generically "Western" in their inspiration. Among Busch's other works was the suite Ozarka, about the Ozarks in southern Missouri.

== Honors and recognition ==
Busch was knighted by King Christian X of Denmark to the Order of the Dannebrog in September 1912. He became known as "Sir Carl." In October 1924, Busch was further awarded the Royal Norwegian Order of St. Olav First Class by King Haakon VII of Norway.

The Kansas City Philharmonic honored Busch at a 1938 testimonial concert conducted by Karl Krueger and attended by more than 1,700 people.
