= Liběšice (Louny District) =

- Municipality
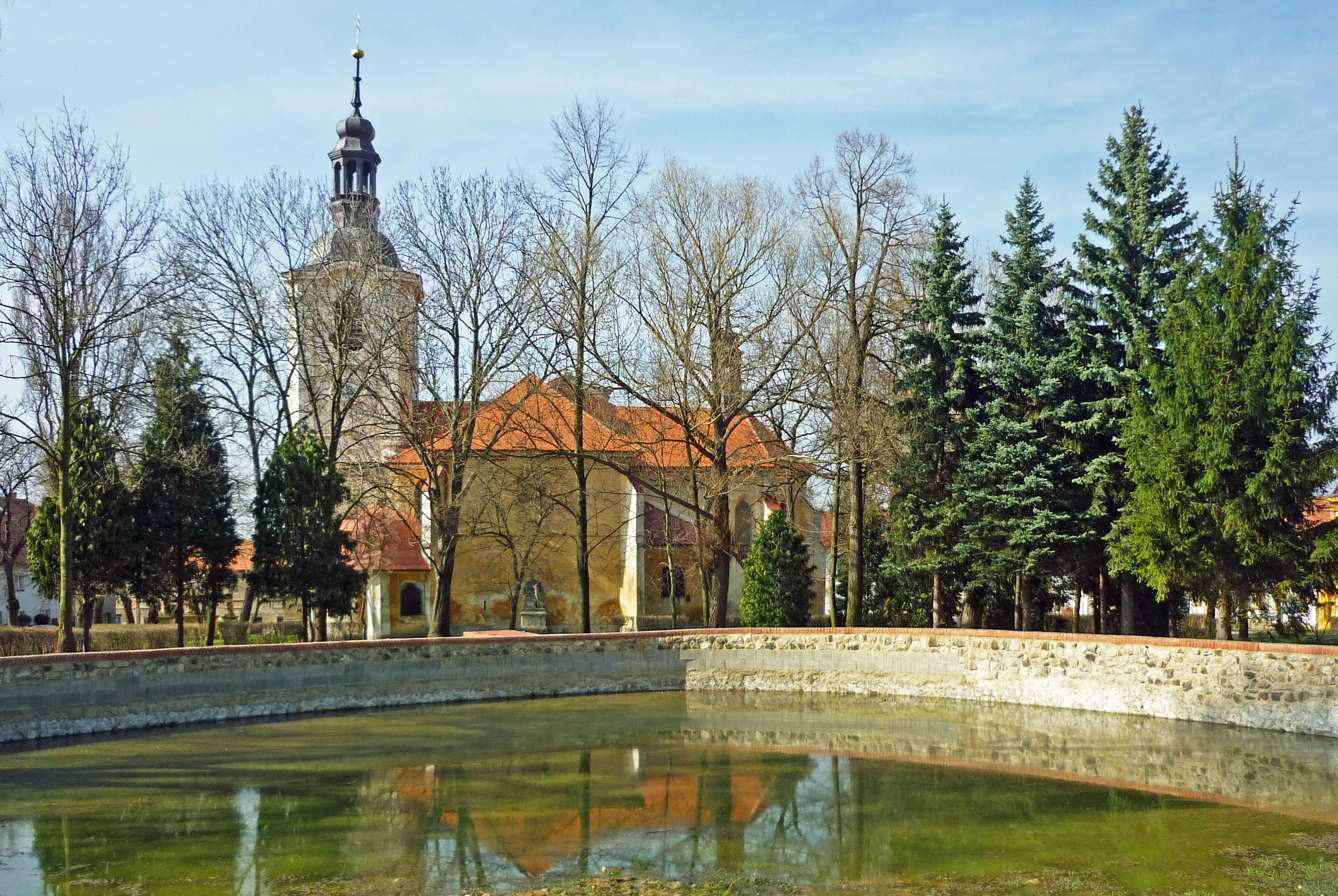
- Church of Saint Martin

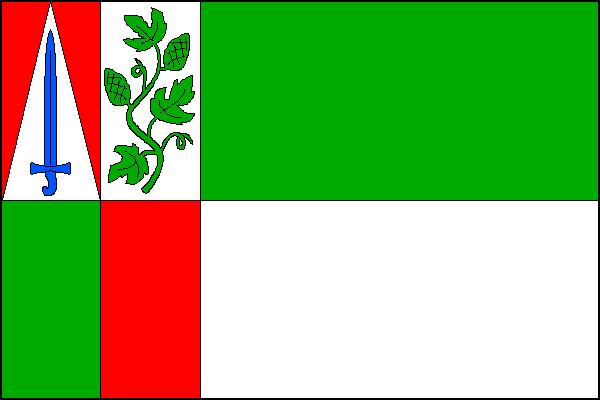
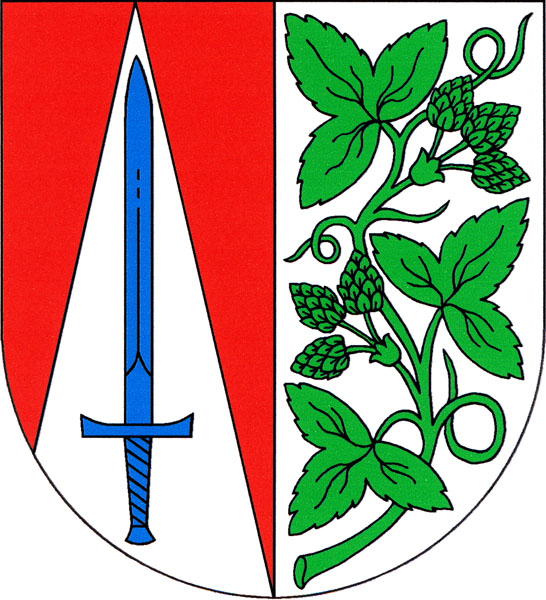
- Flag Coat of arms

- Location in the Czech Republic
- Coordinates: 50°17′37″N 13°37′18″E
- Country: Czech Republic
- Region: Ústí nad Labem
- District: Louny
- First mentioned: 1281

Area
  - Total: 25.87 km^{2} (9.99 sq mi)
- Elevation: 237 m (778 ft)

Population (2026-01-01)
  - Total: 796
  - Density: 30.8/km^{2} (79.7/sq mi)
- Time zone: UTC+1 (CET)
  - Summer (DST): UTC+2 (CEST)
- Postal codes: 438 01, 439 63
- Website: www.libesice-obec.cz

Liběšice (German: Libeschitz) is a municipality and village in Louny District in the Ústí nad Labem Region of the Czech Republic. It has about 800 inhabitants.

Liběšice lies approximately 15 kilometres (9 mi) south-west of Louny, 51 km (32 mi) south-west of Ústí nad Labem, and 62 km (39 mi) west of Prague.

== Administrative division ==
Liběšice consists of six municipal parts (in brackets population according to the 2021 census):

- Liběšice (279)
- Dobříčany (114)
- Dubčany (38)
- Kluček (116)
- Lhota (40)
- Líčkov (147)

== Demographics ==
Historical population
Year	Pop.	±%
1869	2,273	—
1880	2,358	+3.7%
1890	2,334	−1.0%
1900	2,545	+9.0%
1910	2,486	−2.3%
1921	2,393	−3.7%
1930	2,360	−1.4%
1950	1,113	−52.8%
1961	1,135	+2.0%
1970	926	−18.4%
1980	793	−14.4%
1991	645	−18.7%
2001	639	−0.9%
2011	706	+10.5%
2021	734	+4.0%
Source: Censuses

== Notable people ==
- Oskar Brázda (1887–1977), painter; lived in Líčkov from 1925 and died there
