= Pavel Brázda =

Czech painter

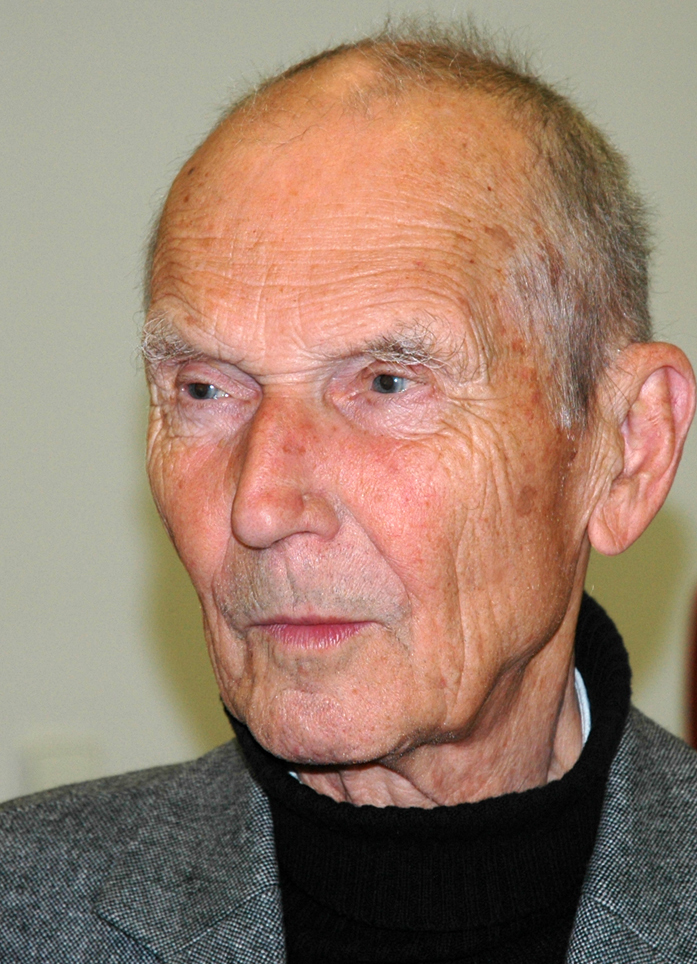
- Pavel Brázda (2012)
- Born: 21 August 1926; Brno, Czechoslovakia
- Died: 17 December 2017 (aged 91); Prague, Czech Republic
- Education: Higher School of Art Industry
- Known for: painter, graphic artist
- Awards: Medal of Merit (Czech Republic)
- Website: www.pavelbrazda.cz

Pavel Brázda (21 August 1926 – 17 December 2017) was a Czech artist. After his expulsion from Academy in 1949 and throughout the communist regime until 1989, his work developed in isolation, without the possibility to exhibit. More consistently than any artist of his generation, Pavel Brázda was an absolutely uncompromising opponent of the communist system. According to Milan Knížák, rector of the Prague Academy, Brázda is considered one of the most original artists in the Czech and European context. After Pavel Brázda's record-breaking exhibition at the National Gallery and the publication of his large monograph in 2006, he was selected as Personality of the Year in a poll of 90 leading art historians.

== Life ==
Pavel Brázda was born the eldest of three children in the family of the Brno lawyer and leader of the Agrarian Party, JUdr. Osvald Brázda. His mother Eva Brázdová, née Koželuhová, was the daughter of Josef Koželuh and Helena Čapková-Koželuhová, sister of brothers Josef and Karel Čapek. Her younger sister, Helena Koželuhová, was a well-known anti-communist journalist. His uncle Adolf Procházka was a minister in the Czechoslovak government-in-exile and after the war he served as a minister until 1948.

After the death of her husband, Pavel Brázda's grandmother Helena Čapková married the poet and diplomat Josef Palivec in 1930 (Palivec was a renowned poet, translator and diplomat awarded with the Legion of Honour). She lived in a villa adjacent to the villa of the Čapek brothers in Vinohrady.

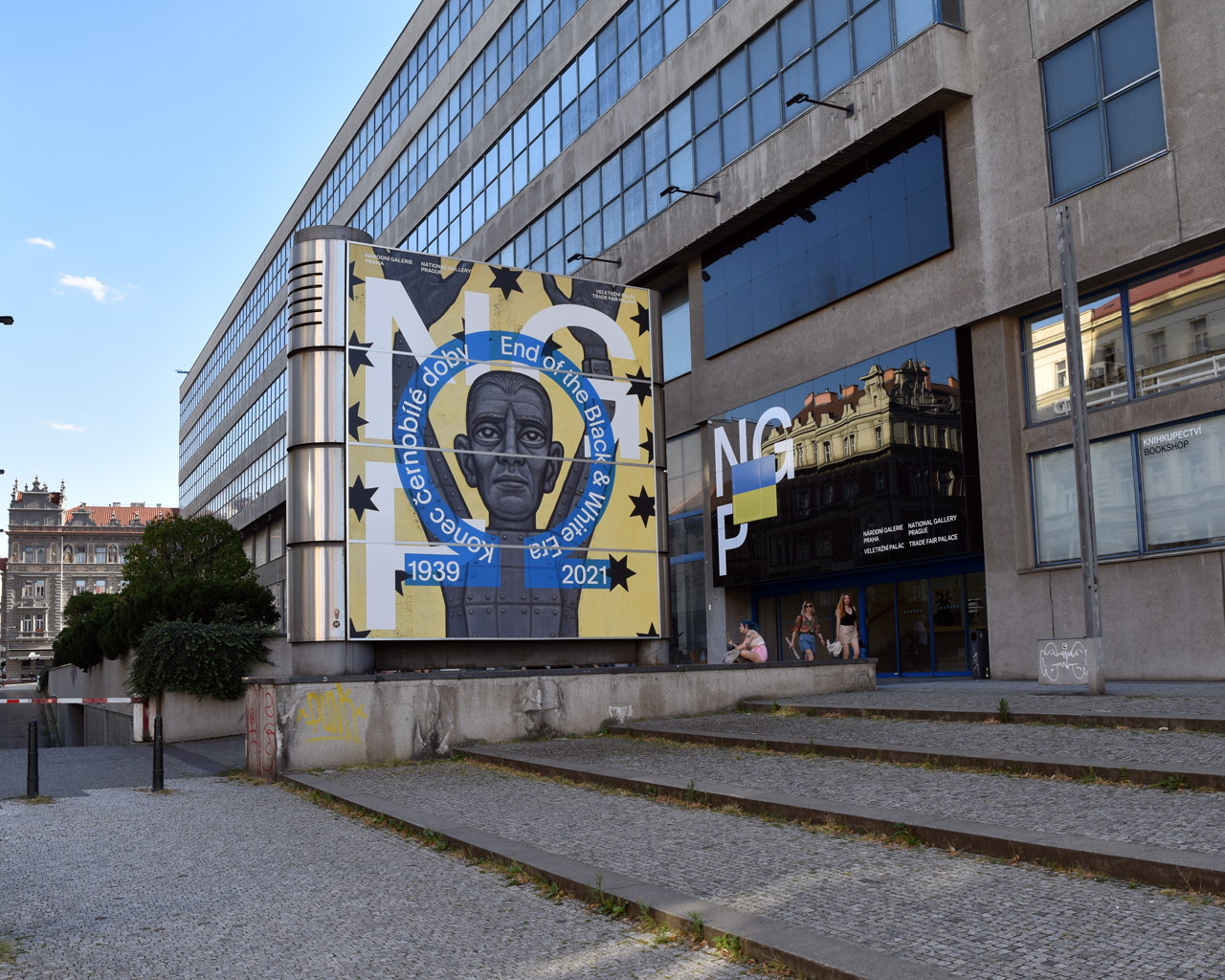
Large Astronaut by Pavel Brázda invites visitors to the collections of modern art in National Gallery Prague (2023)

Pavel Brázda was surrounded by works of Czech modern art at home during his childhood (Zrzavý, Kubišta, Čapek) and from the age of eleven he drew and painted. He was interested in classical music, jazz, literature and also the environment of the urban periphery, which became the subject of his drawings for a long time. During the war he was forcibly deployed as a lumberjack for a year. He had a strongly developed social feeling and in 1945 became an employee of the regional secretariat of the Communist Party (not a party member). This brief first-hand experience of Communist practices was enough for him to break with the Communist Party ideology, and he remained its radical opponent for the rest of his life.

After graduating from a classical grammar school, he enrolled to study philosophy and art history at Masaryk University in Brno, but in 1946 he left for Prague and was accepted into Emil Filla's studio at the Academy of Arts, Architecture and Design in Prague. The studio was run by Filla's assistant Malina, who taught in a way that did not suit Pavel Brázda and he stopped attending the school. In 1947 he visited Paris and saw an exhibition of the Surrealists and Jean Dubuffet. After a year, he was expelled from the Academy for lack of interest and transferred to the Academy of Fine Arts to the studio of Vladimír Sychra. Here he met Věra Nováková. Both were considered gifted students, but were expelled during the communist political purges of 1949. This meant being consigned to manual labour and forbidden to study at any university. Pavel Brázda trained as a house painter and decorator in the private firm of Master Výborný and was to continue his apprenticeship at the boarding school in Nechanice.

Pavel Brázda's parents had their property confiscated in 1948 Czechoslovak coup d'état and his father was sent to a forced labour camp, from where he was subsequently released for health reasons. After his father returned from the labour camp, their Brno apartment was confiscated and they were evicted to the countryside together with their minor daughter to a two-room apartment. From 1948 Pavel Brázda lived in Prague with the Palivec family. After the arrest and conviction of Josef Palivec in 1949, Pavel Brázda married Věra Nováková in 1950 and moved into his grandmother's apartment, who was also threatened with eviction. Thanks to Professor J. Solar, the director of the Higher School of Art Industry, who concealed their cadre assessments, both spouses were able to enter the third year of this high school in 1950 and graduated from Prof. Dillinger's graphic arts school. In 1956, the painter Vlastimil Beneš, secretary of the Union of Czechoslovak Visual Artists, arranged a creative scholarship for Pavel Brázda. In 1959, a daughter Kateřina was born to Mr. and Mrs. Brázda.

The family lived very poorly and both Věra and Pavel earned their living as illustrators of medical scientific books, later especially botanical publications for the archives of the Botanical Institute in Průhonice. Věra also illustrated children's books and leporellos and from the 1980s, when she was employed by the Institute of Archaeology, they both drew archaeological shards at home. Pavel Brázda was able to exhibit three of his paintings for the first time at the May Salon in 1967 and several drawings at the Václav Špála Gallery in 1968. In 1967, when the political regime temporarily relaxed, they were allowed to travel to Italy in search of old art. They were accompanied by Zdeněk Neubauer, who worked in Naples in the 1960s. After the Warsaw Pact invasion of Czechoslovakia, Věra Nováková and Pavel Brázda considered emigration.

During the normalization period, Pavel Brázda worked from 1977 until his retirement as a stoker in a boiler room, where his collaborator Karel Palek (Petr Fidelius) prepared the samizdat Critical Collection. In their apartment, a philosophical circle met, which, in addition to Zdeněk Neubauer, was attended by Jan Sokol, Jiří Němec, Daniel Kroupa, Zdeněk Kratochvíl, Martin Palouš, Věra Jirousová, Vojtěch Sedláček, Václav Žák and others. Prof. Jan Patočka also lectured here.

Together with his wife Věra Nováková and Ivan Sobotka, he created a small closed group of artists, which was only discovered by the wider public after 1989 thanks to the magazine Revolver Revue. His works from the 1950s are still considered to be completely original and radically modern. In 2007, at the age of 81, Brázda discovered the possibilities of working with computers and has been digitally processing and printing his drawings ever since.

He participated in an unofficial exhibition in the underground of the Vinohrady Market Hall in 1989, organized by Pavel Vašíček. His first major exhibition together with Věra Nováková took place in 1992 at PKC Ženské domovy gallery in Prague. In 2006 (on the occasion of his 80th birthday) the National Gallery Prague prepared an extensive and extremely well attended retrospective exhibition, published a representative monograph and included Pavel Brázda's works in its permanent exhibition. Another large retrospective exhibition was organized by the Czech Centre Paris in 2008. In 2009 he had exhibitions at the 5th Floor Gallery in Prague and the Aspekt Gallery in Brno.

The most extensive retrospective exhibitions of Pavel Brázda so far were organized by the Gallery of the Central Bohemian Region in Kutná Hora (28 February – 12 June 2016), as well as the Prague Galleries – 1st Floor, Nová síň Gallery and Gallery at Bethlehem Chapel.

Pavel Brázda was a laureate of the Revolver Revue Award for 1991. In 2007 he was ranked first in the Personality of the Year poll organized by the Klatovy / Klenová Gallery. In 2008 he was awarded the Medal of Merit by President Václav Klaus on 28 October. In February 2013, he returned the medal due to his disagreement with Klaus' positions (e.g. excessive inclination towards Russia). He thus became the first recipient of the award after 1989 to return it.

Pavel Brázda died on 17 December 2017 in Prague at the age of 91.

=== Awards ===
- 1991 Revolver Revue Award
- 2007 Personality of the Year
- 2008 Medal of Merit (returned 2013)

== Work ==
In his youth, Pavel Brázda was close to the Group 42 and its theoretical manifesto The World We Live In, authored by Jindřich Chalupecký, or the relaxed imagery of surrealism. He was much more strongly influenced by literature, as well as the exotic environment of Brno amusement parks and the monumental folk art of advertisements, which had fallen to the verge of kitsch. His own artistic direction, which he formulated together with Jaroslav Dresler and Slava Mančal in 1943–1944 and called "hominism" at the suggestion of Josef Palivec, was a tamed form of expressionism, rejecting artistic formalism and proclaiming "earthly surrealism for common people". During the war, Brázda painted civilian motifs from his surroundings and copied Renaissance masters. In Sychra's studio he learned the principles of academic painting and then used them in his first distinctive portraits.

Pavel Brázda's key work is the painting Obluda čeká, obluda má čas (The monster waits, the monster has time, Brázda´s own likeness, 1949), where he created an expressive self-portrait against the dark background of Prague. The inner rage of the man's face is contrasted with the girlish female nude of Vera and the nest of lovers she holds in her hands. The work encompasses a range of expressions – from anxiety and depression to resilience and an intense need for a feeling of happiness. The following self-portrait Did you forget to shave? (1950) is a light-hearted, ironic paraphrase of barbershop advertisements. Brázda's masterly painted portraits of his wife Věra (Věra with Painted Wings, 1951, Věra with Glasses, 1955) are a counterpart.

The large-scale composition 5 Minutes Before the End of the World (drawing 1953, painting 1966), which paraphrases the apocalyptic paintings of Bosch and Bruegel, was based on partial drawing studies from 1945 onwards and is a reaction to Věra Nováková's monumental drawings Thus Ends the Glory of the World (1952–53) and After the End – Hic iacet omnipotens homo sapiens (1952), as well as to the prevailing war hysteria of the Stalinist communist regime. In the painting, which is brimming with the many details typical of Brázda's works (advertising banners, portraits and self-portraits, anthropomorphized machines, mannequins, infants, borrowings of Renaissance props, surrealistic symbols of eyes and breasts), he used a whole range of artistic techniques from veristic drawing to lapidary simplistic abbreviation.

Pavel and Vera's double portrait The Walking Box (1954) seems to merely ironize contemporary advertising, but in reality it contains the existential angst of the 1950s. At that time, both artists depended on the material support provided by Pavel's grandmother. Brázda's typical auteur drawing style with a strong line has a cycle of paintings called Astronauts, which anticipates Pop art in style. The most important of these, The Large Astronaut (1954), has a monumental effect and became a symbol of Respekt magazine in the early 1990s.

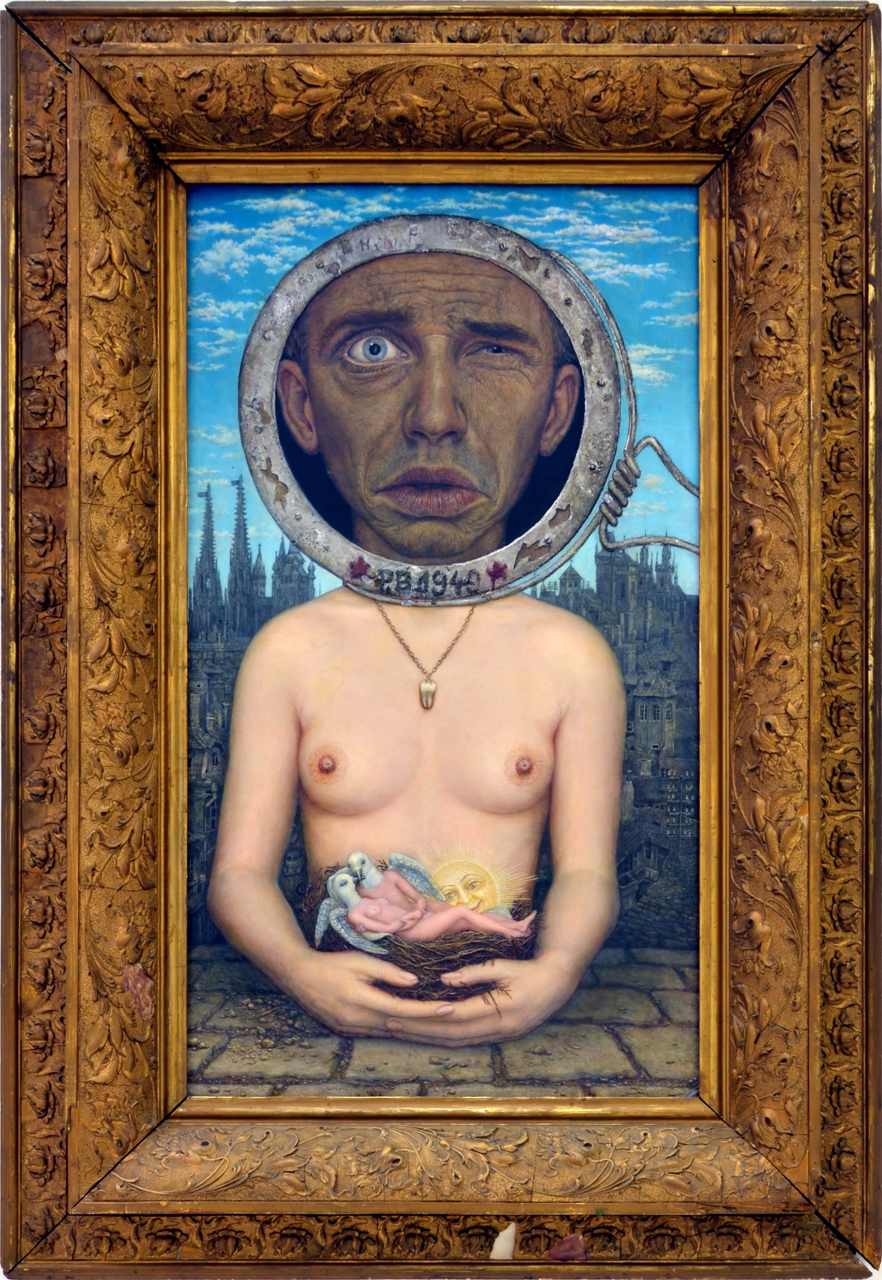
Pavel Brázda, The monster waits, the monster has time, Brázda´s own likeness, 1949

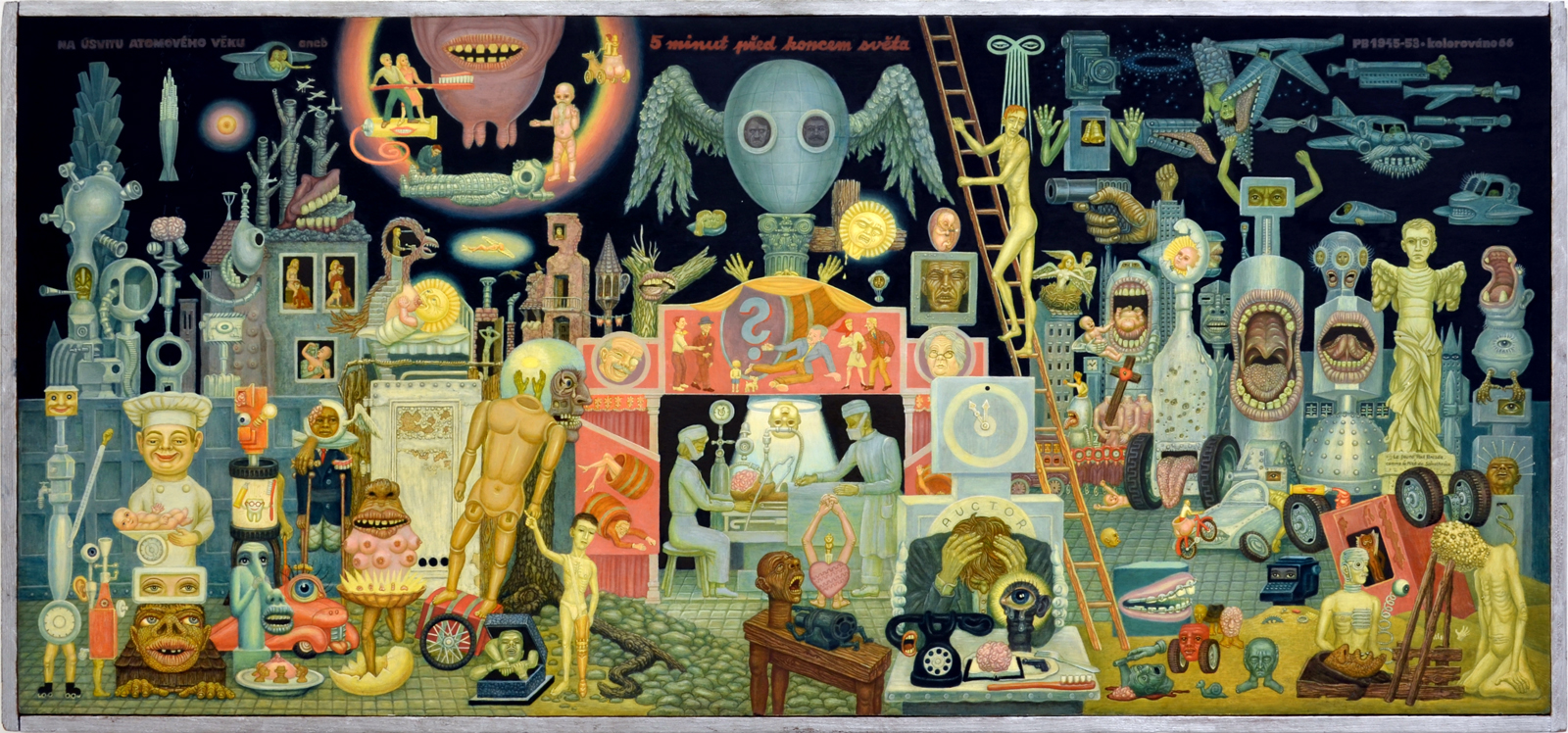
Pavel Brázda, 5 Minutes Before the End of the World, 1945–1966

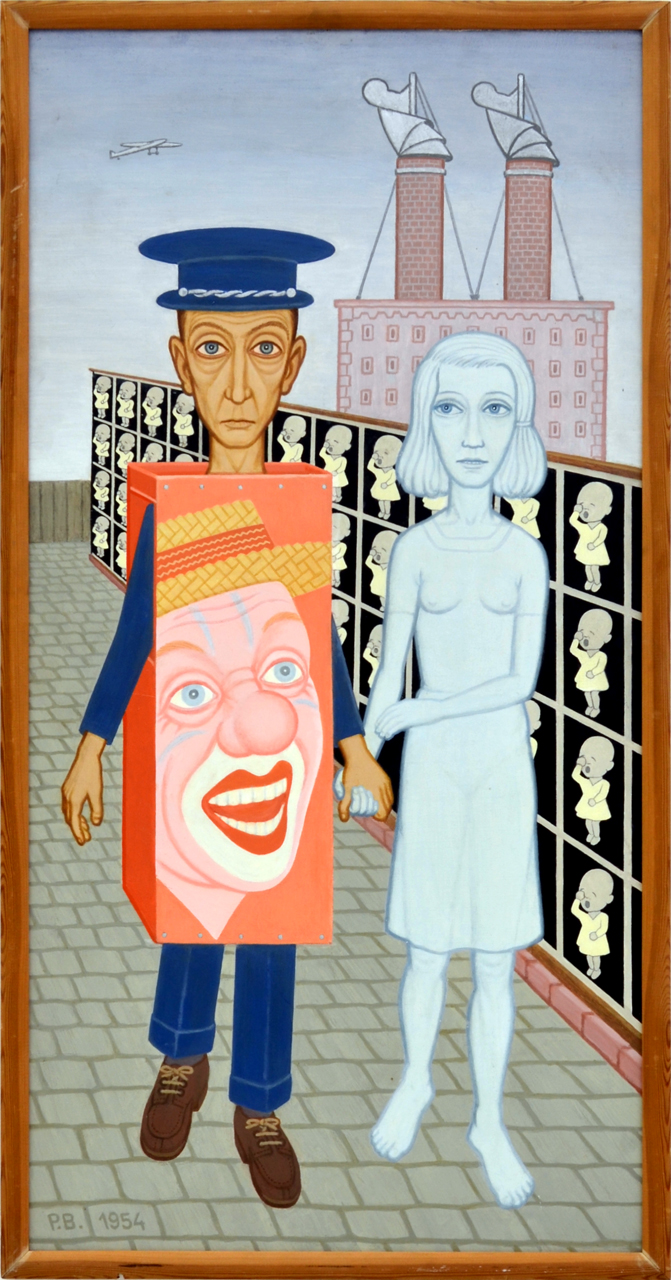
Pavel Brázda, The Walking Box, 1954

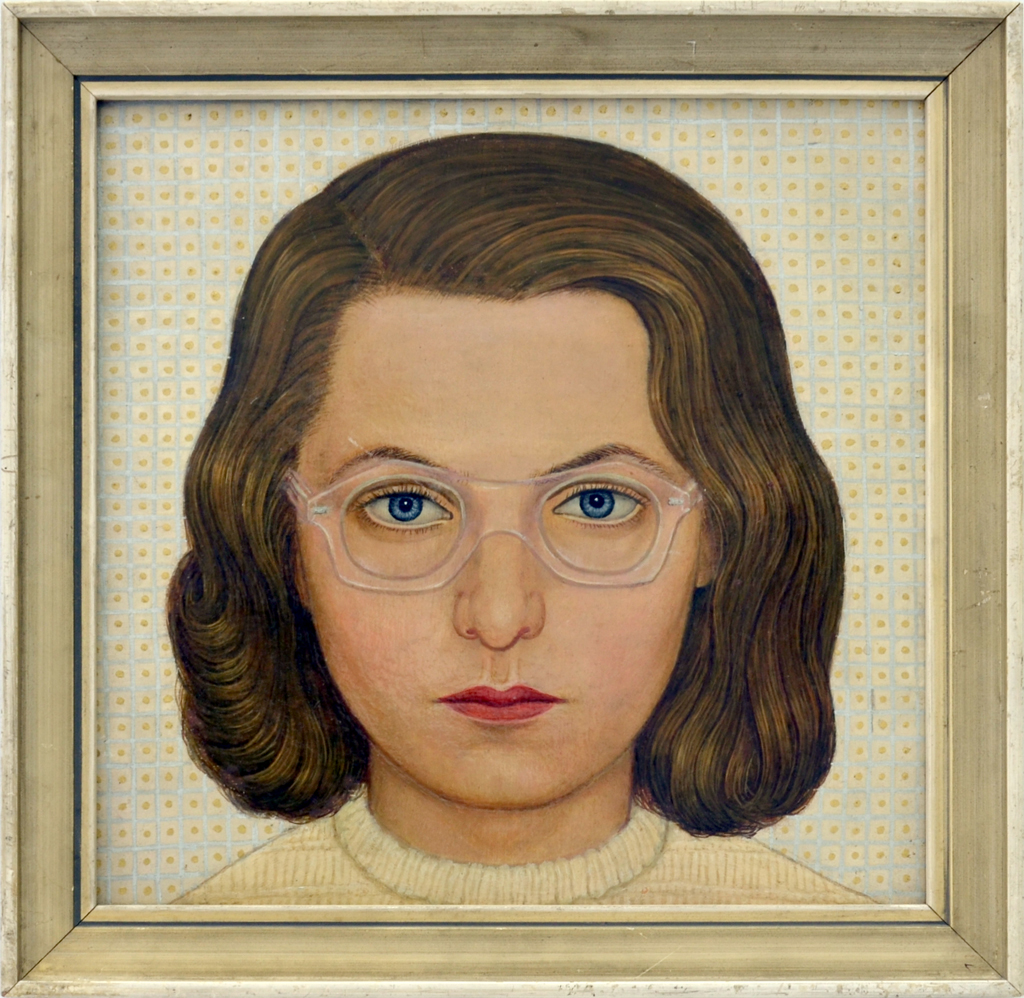
Pavel Brázda, Věra with Glasses, 1955

In 1957–1958, Pavel Brázda decided to help his mother, who was struggling to cope with the forced eviction from Brno and falling into depression. He sent her his drawings, drawn on fabrics, along with a suggestion of harmonious colours, as patterns for embroidery and crochet. The result was a series of embroideries that anticipated some postmodern concepts by 40 years. The simplification of expression to the level of a visual sign is also typical of the theme of the Racers. Brázda has been drawing motorcycle races at the Brno Grand Prix since 1954. Thanks to an art scholarship, he then created a large series where he also uses collage techniques from coloured papers to create a contrast of pure coloured surfaces (The Racers, 1954–1957). In the second half of the 1950s, Brázda created the series War Against the People (1956–1958), which further developed some of his painting techniques. The brutal coldness of the faces and the absurdity of the military machine also reflect his personal feelings about the suppression of the Hungarian Revolution of 1956 by Russian tanks (Over a Dead Foe, 1958, Over a Dead Enemy, 1958).

In the early 1960s, many artists experimented with new materials, and Pavel Brázda also tried the possibilities of working with the synthetic resin acronex, which could be mixed with various fillers to create relief structures or assemblages. In addition to abstract assemblages (Explosion in the Head), he created a number of predominantly figurative structural paintings (The Man Who Ate the Hedgehog). In 1967, artists who were not members of the Union of Czechoslovak Visual Artists were given the opportunity to exhibit their works at the 1st Prague Salon. Pavel Brázda exhibited three paintings created specifically for this occasion – The End of Marat, as a political allegory depicting the end of the revolution, Father´s Portrait, conceived as a triptych with a central larger-than-life image of the father and profiles of Pavel and Vera on triangular wings, and Noli me tangere (the painting was sold by the Union of Czechoslovak Visual Artists to an unknown buyer and is missing).

In the 1960s, Vera and Pavel Brázda managed to obtain several commissions to illustrate books. Apart from Pavel's grandmother Helena Čapková's memoir My Dear Brothers (1963) and Karel Čapek's Krakatit (1963), it was Josef Hiršal and Bohumila Grögerová's What will words tell (SNDK Prague 1964). This book provided an opportunity to experiment with the arrangement of surface and space, which Pavel Brázda used much later, e.g. in the installation of his own exhibitions.

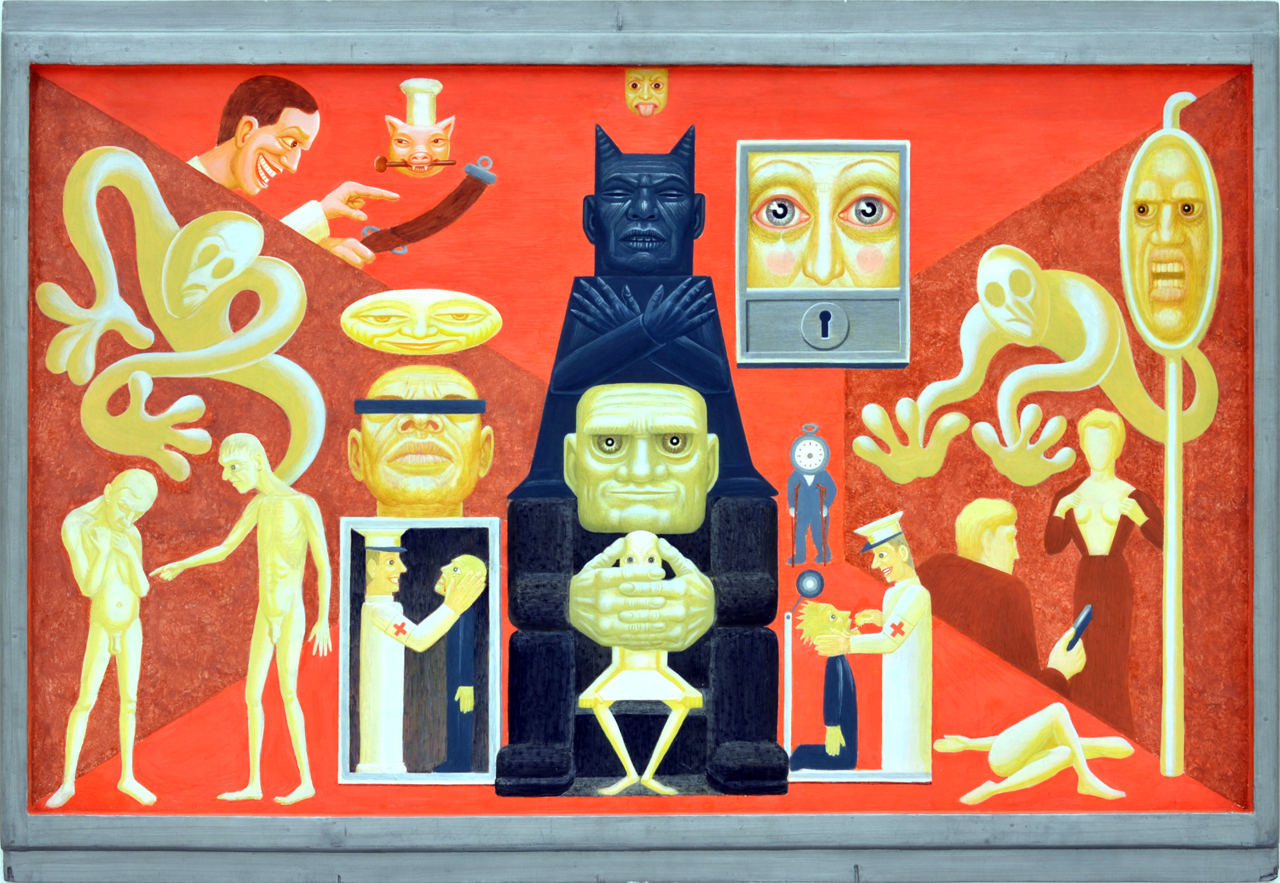
Pavel Brázda, Process, 2nd half of the 1970s

The beginning of the 1970s and the subsequent normalization were accompanied by general scepticism, which is manifested in Pavel Brázda's work by a return to existential themes. The painting Process (1975) is a reminder of the communist monster trials of the 1950s, of which Brázda's grandfather Josef Palivec was a victim. The centre of the painting is dominated by a hard, impersonal and terrifying likeness of the Investigator, who clutches the victim's temples with the thumbs of his huge hands. On his shoulders stands the black figure of the Judge with the face and horns of Lucifer. The locked box with a woman's face on the right is perhaps Freedom with his mouth gagged. Based on the earlier drawings for Kafka's short stories In the Penal Colony, two figures of the Investigator-Nurse were created, one of whom heals by slapping and the other who puts a prearranged statement of his guilt into the victim's mouth as a sacrament. The head above the slapping cell represents the Builder of Happy Tomorrows, who cannot see for his covered eyes. The two naked figures on the left depict the Accuser and the Penitent as an allegory of reformist communism. The scene is completed by ghosts, an advertisement from a butcher shop, and Mr. Time leaning on crutches, whose clock has missing hands.

The despair of the 1970s is also represented by the series Frottage Demons, created as frottage of drawings etched into cardboard. Brázda's already prepared exhibition at State Institute for Drug Control was banned at the last moment by the normalization officials (1975), and so the only opportunity to present his paintings became a joint exhibition with Vera at the small Theatre in Nerudova street (1976). He solved his family's economic situation by accepting a job as a stoker. He began to focus more on drawing and also created a series of sculptural relief heads, inspired by theatrical masks and artworks of Central American civilizations.

In the 1980s, his drawings simplified. They are characterised by staticity, flatness, strong line and strong colour. During the 1990s, he revisited them, enlarging, copying and collaging them to create a large-scale series called The Game. Gradually, Brázda arrived at a grotesque depiction of figures and faces and a radical artistic abbreviation that is more communicative. His Varied Heads was originally created as a study for paintings, but over time became independent. The artist created numerous variations on the theme and explored different combinations of colour by using different toners or coloured papers in the photocopier.

In recent years he has used a computer in his work. The basis was a linear drawing, which he first highlighted in its final form with a marker and then scanned into the computer, where he mixed colours and explored different colour combinations of surfaces and lines. This gave the artist the opportunity to create several colour variations of the original design and to develop a more radical colour palette. The colour prints were made in a maximum of three numbered copies.

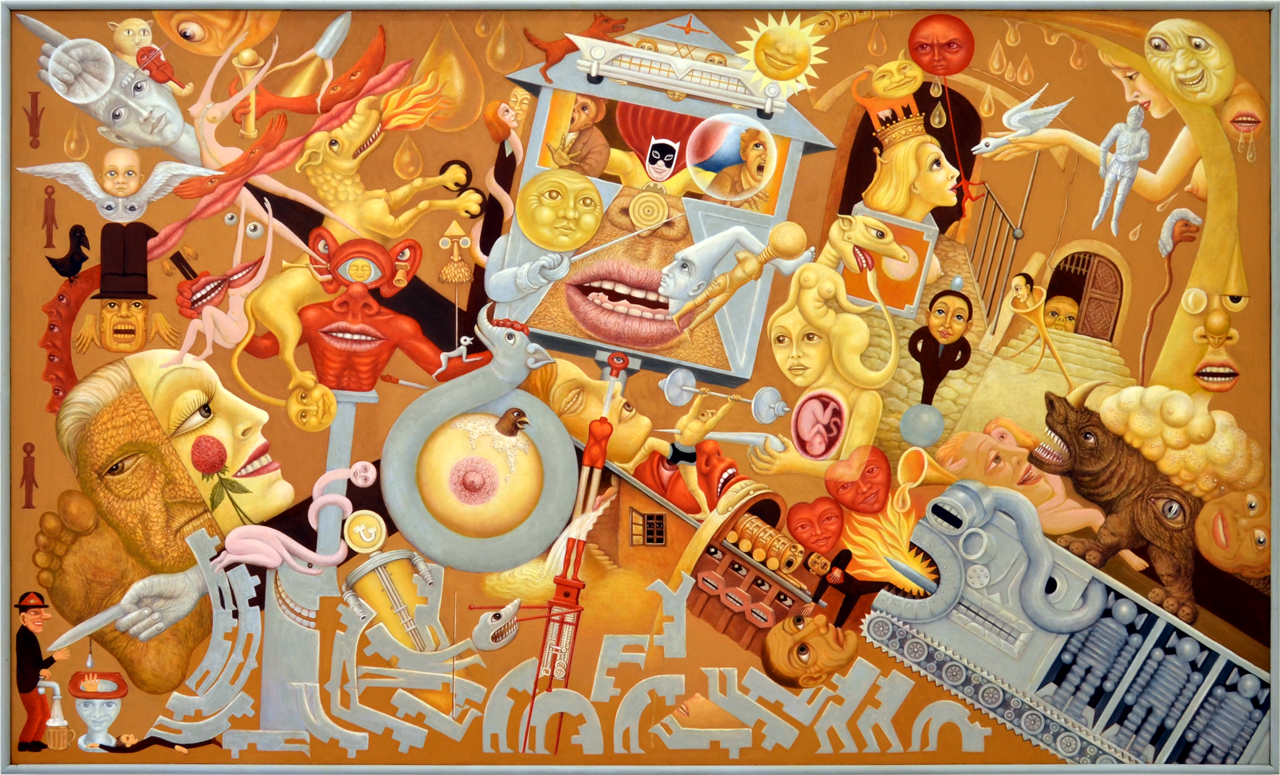
Badman in his native meadow, 1969–2005

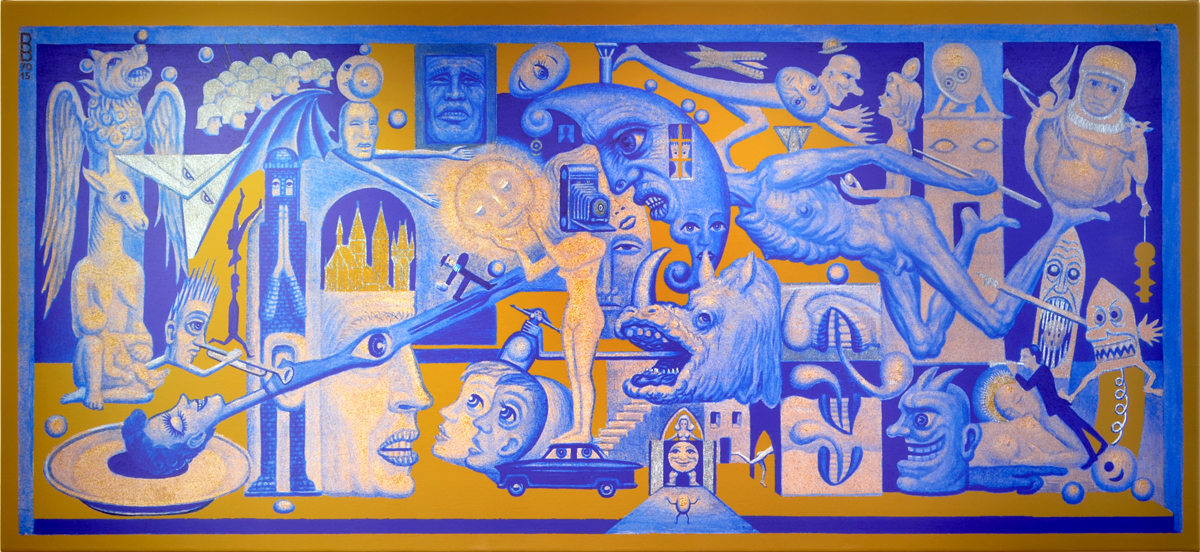
Furious Moon, digital mezzotint, mid-1970s–2014

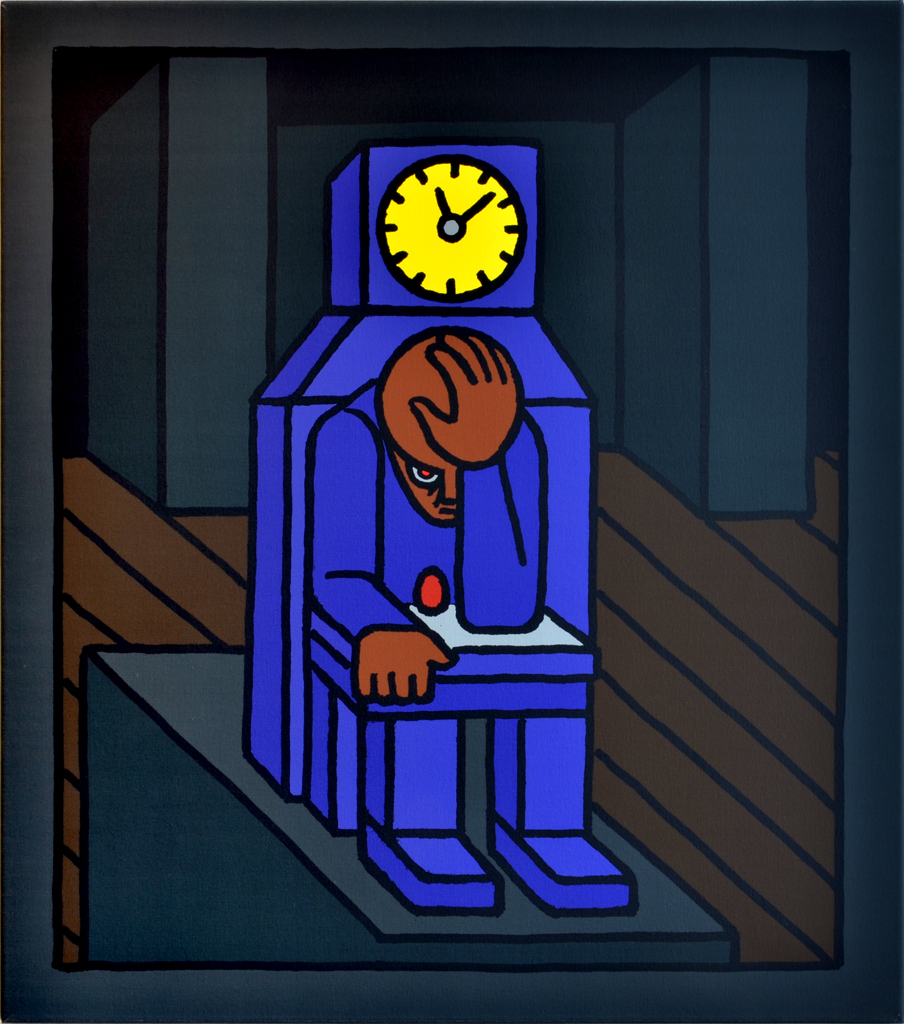
Time Machine, inkjet print on canvas (2007–2015)

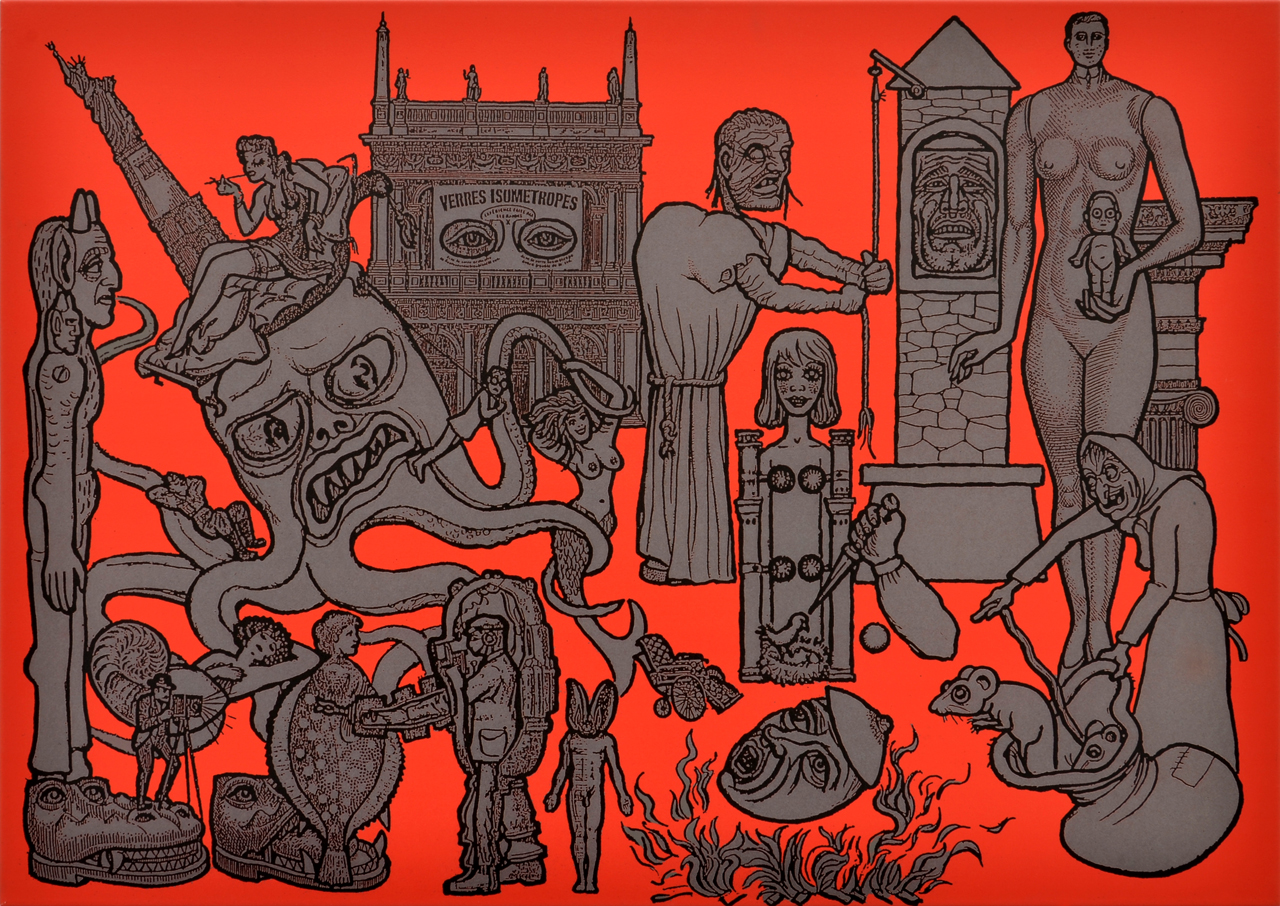
The Bell Rings and..., 2006–2016

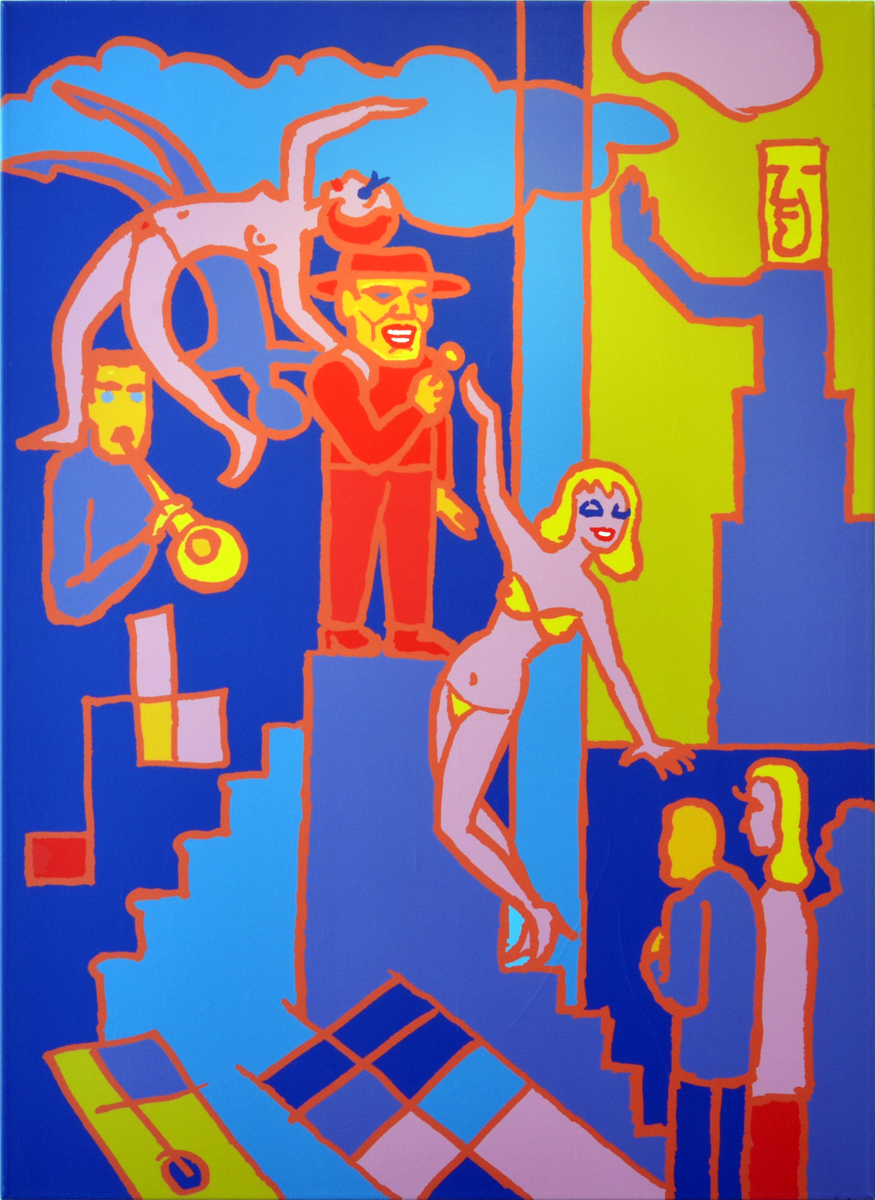
The Principal and his retinue, inkjet print on canvas (2007–2015)

=== Representation in collections ===
- National Gallery in Prague
- Aleš South Bohemian Gallery in Hluboká nad Vltavou
- Gallery of the Central Bohemian Region in Kutná Hora
- Moravian Gallery in Brno
- Gallery of Fine Arts in Cheb
- Gallery Klatovy / Klenová
- Museum of Art and Design Benešov
- Private collections at home and abroad

=== Exhibitions (selection) ===
- 1976 Věra and Pavel Brázda – paintings and drawings, Theatre in Nerudovka, Prague, 14–26 September 1976
- 1989 co-participation in the exhibition Vinohradské tržnice, Prague
- 1992 Pavel Brázda: Stepping in Shit, Fragments from the 1930s–1980s, Galerie bratří Čapků, Prague
- 2000 Pavel Brázda: The monster is waiting, the monster has time, Moravian Gallery in Brno
- 2000/2001 Pavel Brázda: With Calm to People, Mánes, Prague
- 2002 Pavel Brázda: Exhibition of Exhibitions, Gallery of the Čapek Brothers, Prague
- 2006 National Gallery Prague
- 2008 Czech Centre Paris
- 2009 Pavel Brázda: Excerpt from Human Comedy, 5th Floor Gallery, Prague
- 2010/2011 Pavel Brázda: It's Not the End of the World Yet, 5th Floor Gallery, Prague
- 2013 Human Comedy, Municipal House, Prague, 12 February – 19 March 2013
- 2015 Pavel Brázda: Between Beginnings and Endings I, Gallery at the Bethlehem Chapel, Prague
- 2016 Pavel Brázda: Between Beginnings and Endings II, Gallery of the Central Bohemian Region, Kutná Hora
- 2016 Pavel Brázda: Between Beginnings and Endings III, Klatovy / Klenová Gallery
- 2016 Pavel Brázda: Between Beginnings and Endings IV, Nová síň, Prague
- 2016 Navrátil Gallery, Prague
- 2016 Sport: Sport in Art 1945–2016, DOX, Centre for Contemporary Art Prague
- 2017 Fate and Work (Pavel Brázda, Věra Nováková), Egon Schiele Art Centrum, Český Krumlov
- 2017/2018 Pavel Brázda: retrospective, Egon Schiele Art Centrum, Český Krumlov

== Sources ==
- Hynek Glos, Petr Vizina, Stará garda / Old Guard, Argo, Prague 2016, pp. 12–17, ISBN 978-80-257-1881-0
- Richard Drury, Pavel Brázda, Pavla Pečinková: Věra Nováková, 233 pp., Argo, Prague 2010, ISBN 978-80-257-0395-3
- Brázda, Ivana Tomková (ed.), author of accompanying texts Pavel Brázda, transcription by Přemysl Arátor, foreword by Milan Knížák, 284 pp, Argo, Prague 2006, ISBN 9788072038350
- Pavel Brázda – 16 pohlednic / 16 postcards, Argo, Praha 2006, Czech and English, ISBN 9788072038060
- Brázda – Obluda čeká, obluda má čas / The monster waits, the monster has time, Přemysl Arátor (texts), Milan Knížák (foreword), monograph published on the occasion of the great exhibition in Paris, 260 pp, Respekt Publishing, Prague 2008, Czech, English and French, ISBN 978-80-903766-2-5
