= Ulla Bjerne =

Swedish-Finnish author

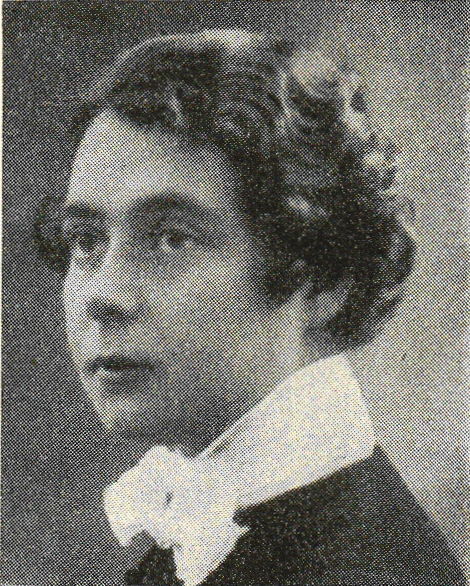
- Born: 1 March 1890; Söderhamn, Sweden
- Died: 16 October 1969 (aged 79); Lovisa, Finland
- Occupation: author
- Spouse: Léon Biaudet
- Writing career
- Pen name: Ali Frost; Lars Doll

Ulla (Gully Cecilia) Bjerne-Biaudet (née Ohlsson), known as Ulla Bjerne, (1 March 1890 – 16 October 1969) was a Swedish-born author who resided in Finland from 1922 onwards. She also wrote under the pen-names Ali Frost and Lars Doll.

== Early life ==
Born Gully Cecilia Ohlson in 1890 in Söderhamn, her father was Vilgot Ohlson, a merchant and government official of the town. For the first six years of her life she was regularly ill, and her parents often argued. At the age of 16 she was expected to leave home and fend for herself, however her father did not allow her to seek a career as a pianist, actress, or artist. For a time she worked as a governess in Skåne, and then as a companion lady (i.e., a servant) in Värmland. She then studied a course at the Påhlmans Handelsinstitut, a professional trade school in Stockholm, which was paid for with a loan from her uncle Carl Alfred Ohlson.

Following her studies at the Påhlmans Handelsinstitut she subsequently worked as a clerk for five years, working first in Malmö, then Trelleborg, and then emigrating to Copenhagen in Denmark, before finally ending up in Paris in the autumn of 1911. In Copenhagen she took up the name "Ulla", a name she already used at school, as her employers considered the name "Gully" to be a boy's name, and began using the surname "Bjerne". Whilst in Copenhagen she also began a relationship with a French merchant Berthold Dieden who paid for her travel to France, as well as becoming friends with the journalist and artist Iwar Donnér. Whilst in Paris she took up her studies again, and made the acquaintance of artists Nils Dardel and Tor Bjurström and the author Gustaf Hellström.

== Literary career ==
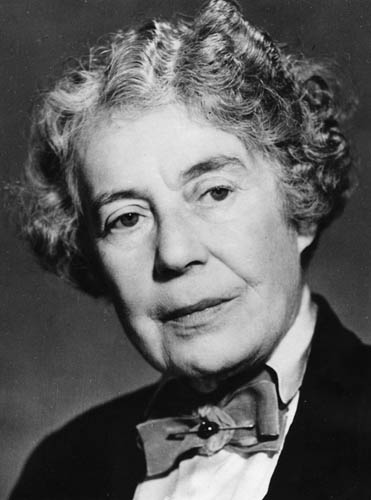
Bjerne in later life

Ulla Bjerne returned to Denmark where she became friends with lawyer and psychologist Andreas Bjerre. It was whilst Bjerne was in Denmark that she made her literary debut with the 1916 novel Mitt andra jag (My Other Self) which was published by Dahlbergs Förlag. Bjerne's books Dårarnes väg (The Path Of Fools, 1917), Ingen mans kvinna (No Man's Woman, 1919) and Blodets krav (Blood Cravings, 1920) were also published with Dahlbergs Förlag before they went bankrupt in 1920 and Bjerne was transferred to the Bonniers publishing house. Ingen mans kvinna has been described by Swedish literary scholar Kristina Fjelkestam as the first Swedish Künstlerroman in which the main protagonist was a woman. Due to occasional rejections that Bjerne's manuscripts received from Bonneirs due to poor sales figures, Bjerne later worked with the Finnish-Swedish publishing house Holger Schildts Förlag.

After the end of the first world war Bjerne began travelling again, and met the doctor Léon Biaudet, with whom she settled in Lovissa, Finland from 1922 onwards. Despite living in Lovissa, Bjerne continued to travel regularly, including to North Africa, and numerous books were published during this period. Her travels were curtailed during the second world war during which time her husband was also called up for service with the army in spite of his advanced age. Her works, which often focused on behaviour considered "immoral" at the time, being relatively outspoken about sex, were often interpreted as being autobiographical, meaning that Bjerne herself was seen in a negative light. A number of her works were openly autobiographical, including Lustjakten (The Yacht, 1944), Livet väntar dej (Life Awaits You, 1955), Den glada otryggheten (The Happy Insecurity, 1958), Botad oskuld, (Cured Innocence, 1961), and Sardiska stigar (Sardinian Paths, 1963). These books were well received, though Bjerne was also criticised for her portrayal of her famous former acquaintances who were by then deceased, particularly Nils Dardel and Gustaf Hellström.

After Biaudet died in February 1968 and Bjerne died in October 1969 they left their house and possessions to the Finnish Writer's Association of Sweden. Their house, now known as Villa Biaudet, became a scholarship-home for various recipients, including Bengt Ahlfors, Claes Andersson, Per Hakon Påwals, Johan Bargum, and Joakim Groth.
