= Poul Bjerre =

Swedish psychiatrist (1876–1964)

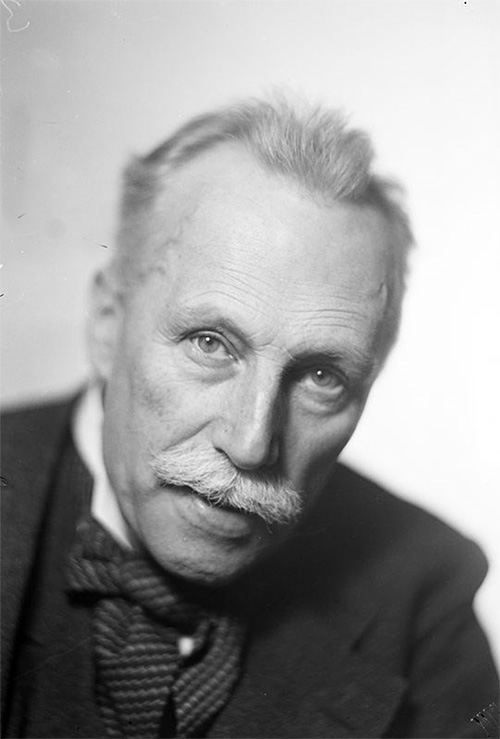
- Born: 24 May 1876; Gothenburg
- Died: 15 July 1964 (aged 88); Vårsta
- Known for: introducing psychoanalysis and Freudian psychiatric concepts into Swedish medicine
- Medical career
- Field: psychiatry
- Notable works: Död och Förnyelse

Poul Carl Bjerre (24 May 1876 – 15 July 1964) was a Swedish psychiatrist who was a native of Gothenburg. In 1907 he succeeded hypnotist Otto Georg Wetterstrand at the latter's medical practice in Stockholm. He was the brother of Andreas Bjerre.

== Career ==
Bjerre is credited for introducing psychoanalysis and Freudian psychiatric concepts into Swedish medicine, which he presented to a 1911 gathering of the "Order of Swedish Physicians". He would later distance himself from a number of Freudian ideas. Bjerre believed that the workings of the conscious mind were more important than those of the unconscious, and felt that Freud placed too much emphasis on an individual's sex life. He believed that it was important for the psychiatrist to "be human", and to view and treat his patient in an holistic manner. Bjerre was also a major advocate of hypnosis.

Among his written works was an influential book which theorized on the recurring cycle of "psychic death and renewal" called Död och Förnyelse. He wrote a biography on Friedrich Nietzsche, and is remembered for his written correspondence with Freud and Carl Jung. He died in Vårsta.

== Personal life ==
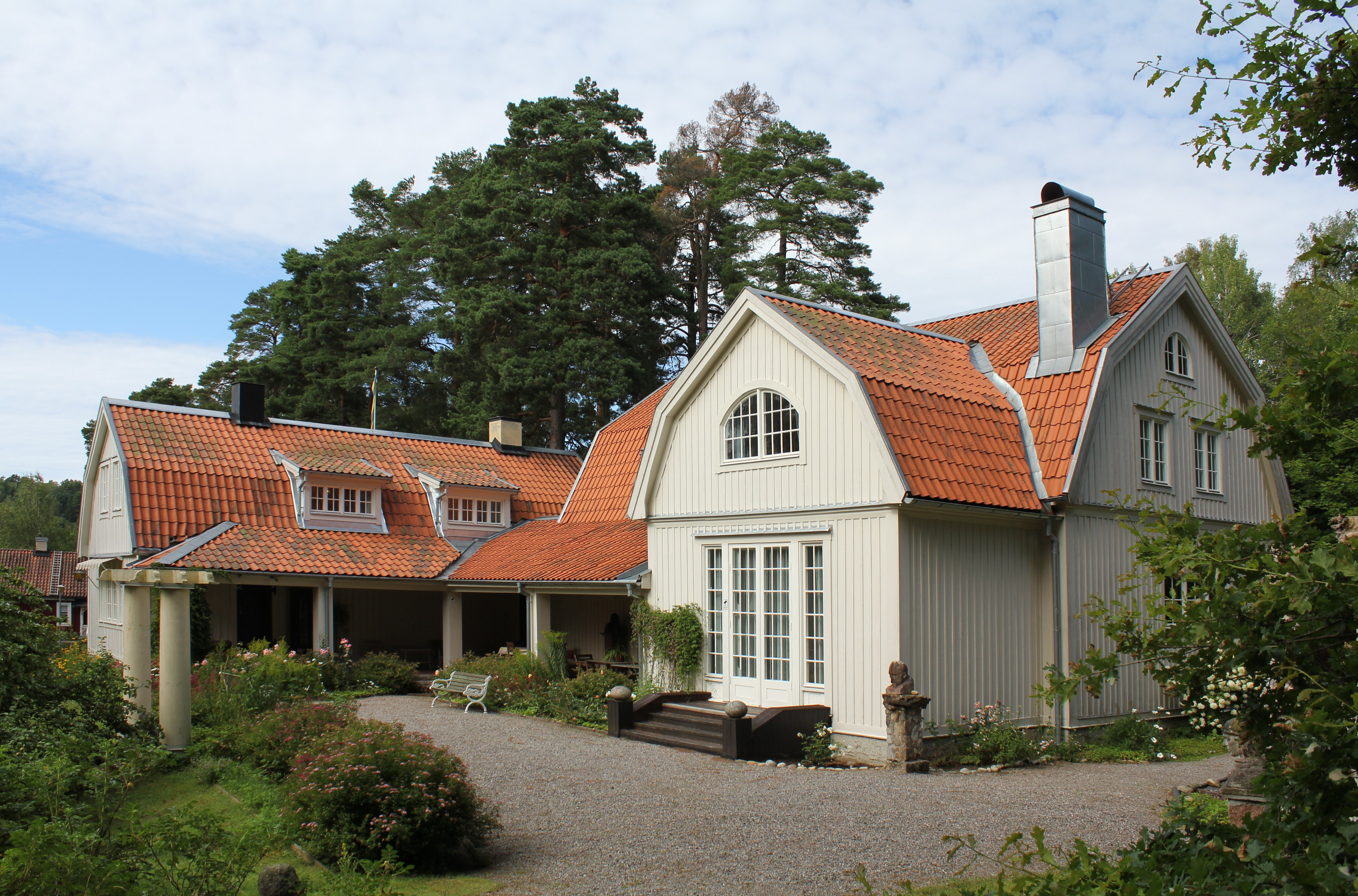
His home in Vårsta

In 1905 Poul Bjerre married Gunhild Wennerberg, who was the mother of his sister-in-law Amelie Posse. They remained married until Wennerberg's death in 1925.

== Portrayal in Bära bud ==
The relationship between the Poul and Andreas Bjerre was the subject of the 2008 historical novel Bära bud by Norwegian author Håkan Bravinger, which was based on the diaries kept by the two brothers as well as other historical documents. In the novel Bravinger portrays Andreas Bjerre's death from suicide, leaving a note for his wife Madeleine and for his mother. His brother Poul, for whom Andreas had often expressed great hatred in his diaries, is portrayed as refusing to accept that it was suicide.

== Published works ==
In English:

- "The history and practice of psychoanalysis", 1916
- "Death and renewal", 1929
- "The remaking of marriage; a contribution to the psychology of sex relationship", 1931

In German:

- Der geniale Wahnsinn. Eine Studie zum Gedächtnisse Nietzsches, 1904
- Wie deine Seele geheilt wird. Der Weg zur Lösung seelischer Konflikte, 1920
- Unruhe, Zwang, Angst, 1955
- Psychosynthese, 1971 - (Psychosynthesis, part of the series- "Schriftenreihe zur Theorie und Praxis der medizinischen Psychologie", Volume 20.
