= Zdeněk Neubauer =

Czech philosopher and biologist (1942–2016)

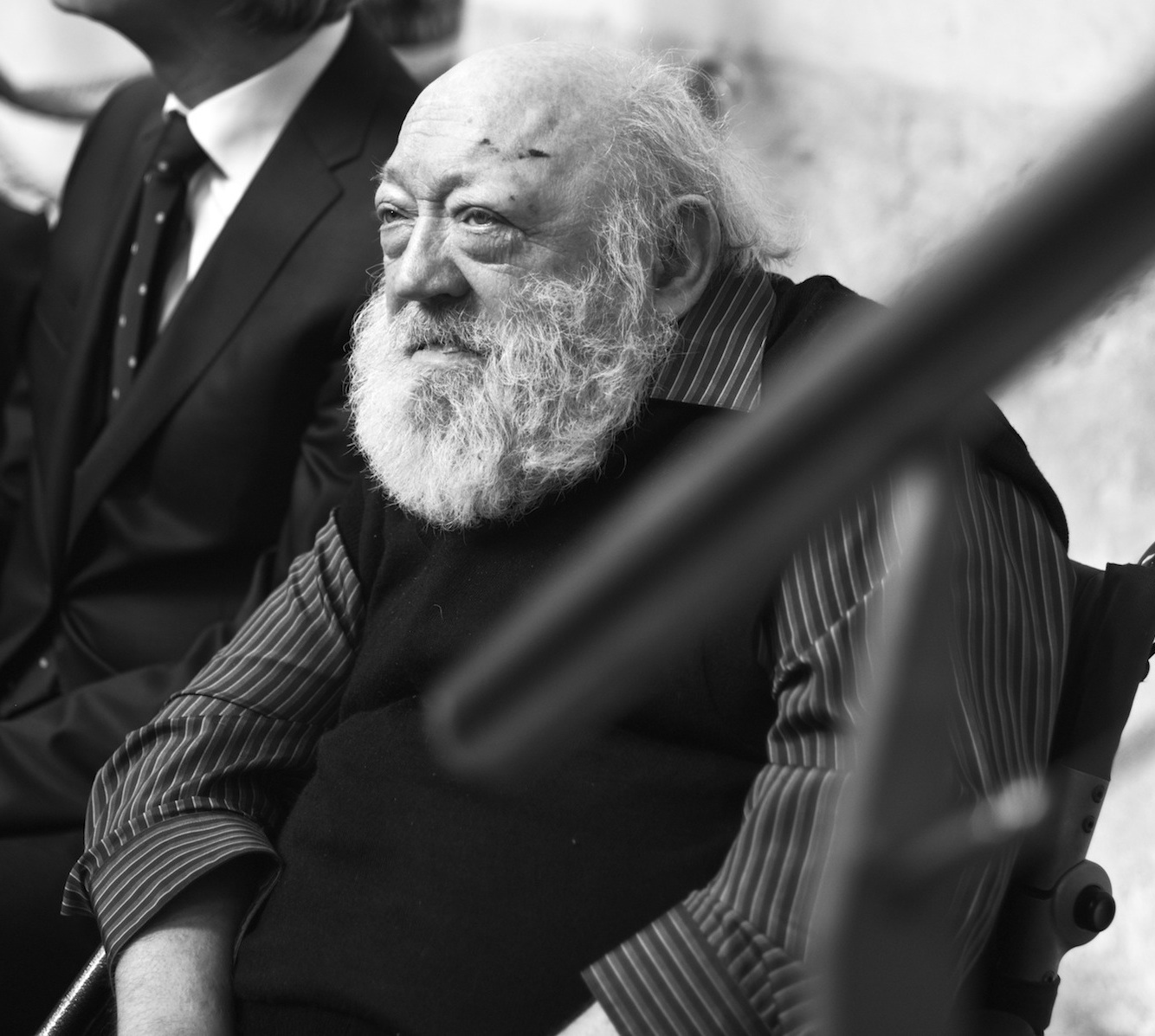
Zdeněk Neubauer in 2014

Zdeněk Neubauer (30 May 1942 – 5 July 2016) was a Czech philosopher and biologist, remarkable especially for original interpretations in science history and epistemology.

== Biography ==
Born in Brno to family of the Brno normative legal school representative Zdeněk Neubauer (sr.), Neubauer graduated from Charles University in Prague (1965 in microbiology, biology and chemistry, 1971 in philosophy). During his activity in Laboratorio Internazionale di Genetica e Biofisica in Naples (1967–1970) he made several discoveries in genetics. In 1982 left the university because of nonconformist attitudes (both scientific and political). After that, he was mainly a philosopher (a programmer analyst by job), publishing underground. Since 1990, he has been a member of the department of philosophy and history of science at Charles University Faculty of Science.

== Selected bibliography ==
=== Books ===
- Deus et Natura, 1979/1980 and 1999.
- Od Smyslu Vědeckého Poznání k vědě jako poznávání smyslu (From Reason of Scientific Knowledge to Science as Cognition of Reason), 1979.
- Střetnutí paradigmat v současné biologii (Clash of Paradigms in Contemporary Biology), 1985.
- Nový Areopág (The New Areopagus), 1992.
- Přímluvce postmoderny (An Intercessor of Postmodernity), 1994.
- Smysl a svět (Sense and Universe), 2001.
- O svatém Františku aneb zrození ducha novověku (On Saint Francis or the Birth of the Spirit of Modern Age), 2006.

=== Articles ===
- A brief consideration on the meaning of the lysogenic conversion, 1967, in Nature.
- A model concerning the early functions in lambda bacteriophage, 1968.
- Physics and Human Thought, 1995, in Zwilling (ed.): Natural Sciences and Human Thought. Berlin-Heidelberg.
