= Jens Bjerre =

Jens Bjerre may refer to:

- Jens Bjerre Jacobsen (1903–1986), Danish composer and organist
- Jens Bjerre (adventurer) (1921–2020), Danish author, filmmaker and adventurer
