= Iwar Donnér =

Swedish artist and illustrator

- Born: 31 March 1884; Sölvesborg, Sweden
- Died: 1964 (aged 79–80); Stockholm, Sweden
- Spouse(s): Cätschen Looft (1915); Astrid Cassel (1930–38)

Nils Olof Iwar Donnér (31 March 1884 – 1964) was a Swedish artist and illustrator.

== Early life ==
Iwar Donnér was born in Sölvesborg in 1884 to August Donner, who was the mayor of the town, and Alma Lundgren Donner. At a young age he went to sea aboard the British ship Ewardina that cruised between the UK and Rangoon, until she sank whilst he was on leave in Liverpool. Donnér began studying art at Valand Academy in Gothenburg, which was followed by a ten-year period, 1910–1920, in Copenhagen where he made the acquaintance of the Swedish female author Ulla Bjerne. In the years 1920–1922 he was in Paris, where he studied under L'hote and Arogeau, and later returned to Paris and travelled extensively in the Mediterranean.

== Artistic career ==
During his stay in Copenhagen Donnér made his name as an illustrator drawing humorous cartoons for the Danish newspaper Politiken, and later worked for Dagens Nyheter and Stockholms-Tidningen. From 1919 onwards he began to focus more on painting works of art, with his art being exhibited in Stockholm in 1940, in Örebro in 1941 and in Norrköping and Västerås in 1942. His works contained sailing and Mediterranean motifs.

== Personal life ==
In 1915 he was married to Cätschen Looft, and from 1930 to 1938 to Astrid Cassel.
