= Iwar von Lücken =

German poet

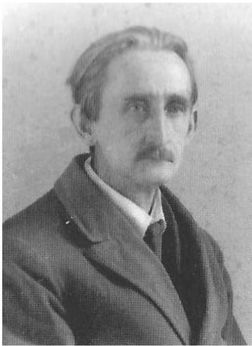
Image of Iwar von Lücken

Iwar von Lücken (January 19, 1874, in Wiesbaden, Germany – 1935 (exact date unknown), in Paris, France) was a German poet and part of the avant garde art scene in Leipzig and Berlin of the Inter-War period. He was a subject of several paintings by Otto Dix and Oskar Kokoschka, the main reason he is known at all today. Though he made an impression on those who met him and is mentioned in various period biographies, the details of his life and death are not well known and his one slim book of poems has received little recognition in his life or thereafter.

== Family ==
Iwar and his sister were the only children of Rudolf Karl Louis Adolf von Lücken who died in Dresden in 1923. For this particular branch of the family - ancient Mecklenburg nobility going back to the 13th century - the line ends with Iwar. The absence of any details in the entry of Genealogisches Handbuch des Adels regarding his education, war service and occupation might lead one to suspect a "black sheep". Not much is known about his childhood, upbringing, and education.

== Later life ==
Any information about Lücken's life during the 20s and 30s is fragmented and difficult to come by. He appeared to sustain himself on the diet of "nothing but art and literature", with the death of his father in Dresden in 1923 having no effect on his material circumstances given the family's attitude towards his lifestyle. Lücken was appreciated by no more than about a dozen discerning people in Vienna, Dresden, and Berlin. It seems reasonable to assume that at some stage he was staying in either of the two capitals. The writer Peter de Mendelssohn recalls that he once encountered Lücken sitting in the corner of a "Künstlerkneipe" in Berlin, some time between 1927 and 1929 - he had no money apart from a few small coins which he had obtained by begging and kept in a cigarette box. It seems that he left Berlin for Paris in 1933 when the Nazis came to power. His last letter is written from Paris in May 1935, and mentions an ambition to take a part in a sail to Greece via Italy. It also mentions recent serious illness, and to judge by the deterioration in the handwriting it is even doubtful whether he would have been fit enough to travel. The exact circumstances of his death and the whereabouts of his grave are not known.

=== Description by Hoffmann ===
A description of Iwar von Lücken in the book by Edith Hoffmann on Kokoschka reads: "Iwar von Lücken was a Baltic aristocrat disowned by his family because he preached - and practised - Tolstoian principles; a poet and a man of great knowledge, whom poverty reduced to a Don Quixote-like appearance; while all the others cultivated a conscious dissimilarity from other people but were in fact comfortably connected with the bourgeois world which provided for their needs, Lücken, with his unworldliness, his extreme modesty, his love for children, his classical quotations, his old-fashioned politeness, his weakness for the bottle and his disreputable suits, was probably the last real Bohemian".

== Works ==
It does not seem that von Lücken's literary output was very great, although according to people who knew him, much of what he did write, including dramas and essays, he destroyed.

An edition of poems (Gedichte) by Iwar von Lücken was published in Berlin in 1928, it contained twenty-nine poems, most no longer than twenty lines, a number of which had already been previously published in literary magazines. Of this slim volume only two copies survived (both are in the libraries of Berlin).

== Influences ==
The influence of Hölderlin is marked throughout Lücken's poetry: he has a predilection for such unrevolutionary subjects as innocence and experience, creativity, joy and pain, joy through suffering, life in Nature, life in feeling. There is no hatred or bitterness, little violence, and much positive delight is what is most natural, spontaneous, and most vibrantly alive.
