= Andreas Bjerre =

Swedish professor and psychologist (1879–1925)

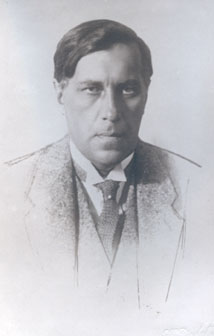
- Born: 21 March 1879; Gothenburg, Sweden
- Died: 22 November 1925 (aged 46); Finja, Tyringe, Sweden
- Spouse(s): Amelie Posse (1905-1912); Madeleine Bennet (1912-1925)
- Children: Sören Christer Bjerre
- Scientific career
- Fields: Criminal law, criminal psychology, criminology

Sören Andreas Bjerre, known as Andreas Bjerre, (21 March 1879 – 22 November 1925) was a Swedish academic specialising in criminal law and criminal psychology.

== Early life and career ==
Born in Göteborg in 1879, Andreas Bjerre was the son of Sören Bjerre, who was a rich butter-merchant, and Sophie Jörgensen. His brother was the psychologist Poul Bjerre (1876-1964).

Andreas Bjerre studied as a student in Strängnäs from 1897, and received his bachelor's degree in Uppsala in 1900. In winter 1900-1901 he studied in Paris, and received his degree in law (Juris utriusque kandidat) in Lund in 1904, before studying in Berlin from late 1904 until 1906 under Franz von Liszt. He enrolled at Stockholm University in 1909 and received and his master's and doctorate degrees in law there in the following year. He worked as a notary at the judge's office and also as a judge in the period 1907–8. During the years 1910-1915 Bjerre studied the psychology of criminals intensively in Swedish prisons, and was appointed to the board of the association of Swedish Criminologists where he also edited their journal Förhandlingar from 1915 to 1918.

In 1919 Bjerre was made a professor of criminal law at the University of Dorpat (now known as Tartu) in Estonia, and became also the professor of legal philosophy there from 1921. In 1925 his work Bidrag till mordets psykologi was published, one of the first works on the subject of the psychology of murderers. It was later translated into German and English, with the English title being The Psychology of Murder. The book was based on interviews with convicts imprisoned for murder at Långholmen prison.

== Personal life and death ==
In 1904 Bjerre married Countess Amelie Posse, later a noted author, pacifist, and anti-Nazist. Posse's mother Gunhild Wennerberg (1860-1925) married Andreas Bjerre's brother Poul the year after. In the same year Posse gave birth to their only child, Sören Christer Bjerre (1905-1967), who was declared insane in 1921 but eventually in adulthood became a journalist. Andreas Bjerre and Posse were divorced in 1912 and Bjerre married Baroness Ida Magdalena (Madeleine) Bennet the same year.

During the first world war Bjerre met the Swedish female author Ulla Bjerne, then living in Denmark. Bjerne later described Bjerre as one of only two men who had ever been important to her, the other being her husband Léon Biaudet.

Bjerre resigned his position at Dorpat University in spring 1925 due to illness. He committed suicide in November 1925 in a guest-house in Tyinge through an overdose of veronal, in bed with his wife Madeleine embracing him. Poul Bjerre later accused Madeleine of murder as she had not called for a doctor.

== Portrayal in Bära bud ==
The relationship between the Poul and Andreas Bjerre was the subject of the 2008 historical novel Bära bud by Norwegian author Håkan Bravinger, which was based on the diaries kept by the two brothers as well as other historical documents. In the novel Bravinger portrays Andreas Bjerre's death, leaving a note for his wife Madeleine and for his mother. His brother Poul, for whom Andreas had often expressed great hatred in his diaries, is portrayed as refusing to accept that it was suicide. Andreas Bjerre is portrayed as having dyslexia, and as someone who drank heavily and was known to frequent prostitutes.
