= Stenkovec Brazda Airfield =

- IATA: none; ICAO: LWSN

Summary
- Location: Brazda, Čučer-Sandevo, Republic of North Macedonia
- Elevation AMSL: 1,150 ft (350 m)
- Coordinates: 42°03′35″N 021°23′17″E

Map
- Location in North Macedonia

Runways
Direction	Length		Surface
Direction	ft	m	Surface
12/30	3,435	1,047	grass

Stenkovec Brazda Airfield is a recreational aerodrome 9 km (5.6 mi) northwest of Skopje in North Macedonia. In the 1990s, it served as a refugee camp for Kosovo Albanians.

== Incidents and accidents ==
On 21 September 2013, a private Cessna 172SP Skyhawk crashed at Stenkovec Airport after the pilot lost control over the airplane due to low airspeed, stall flight at extreme low altitude. The pilot wasn't high enough to gain control over the aircraft to avoid the impact on the ground. The aircraft was written off.

In fall 2025, authorities removed facilities constructed at the airport illegally that were used for celebrations.
