= Egon Schiele Art Centrum =

Museum and gallery in Český Krumlov, Czech Republic

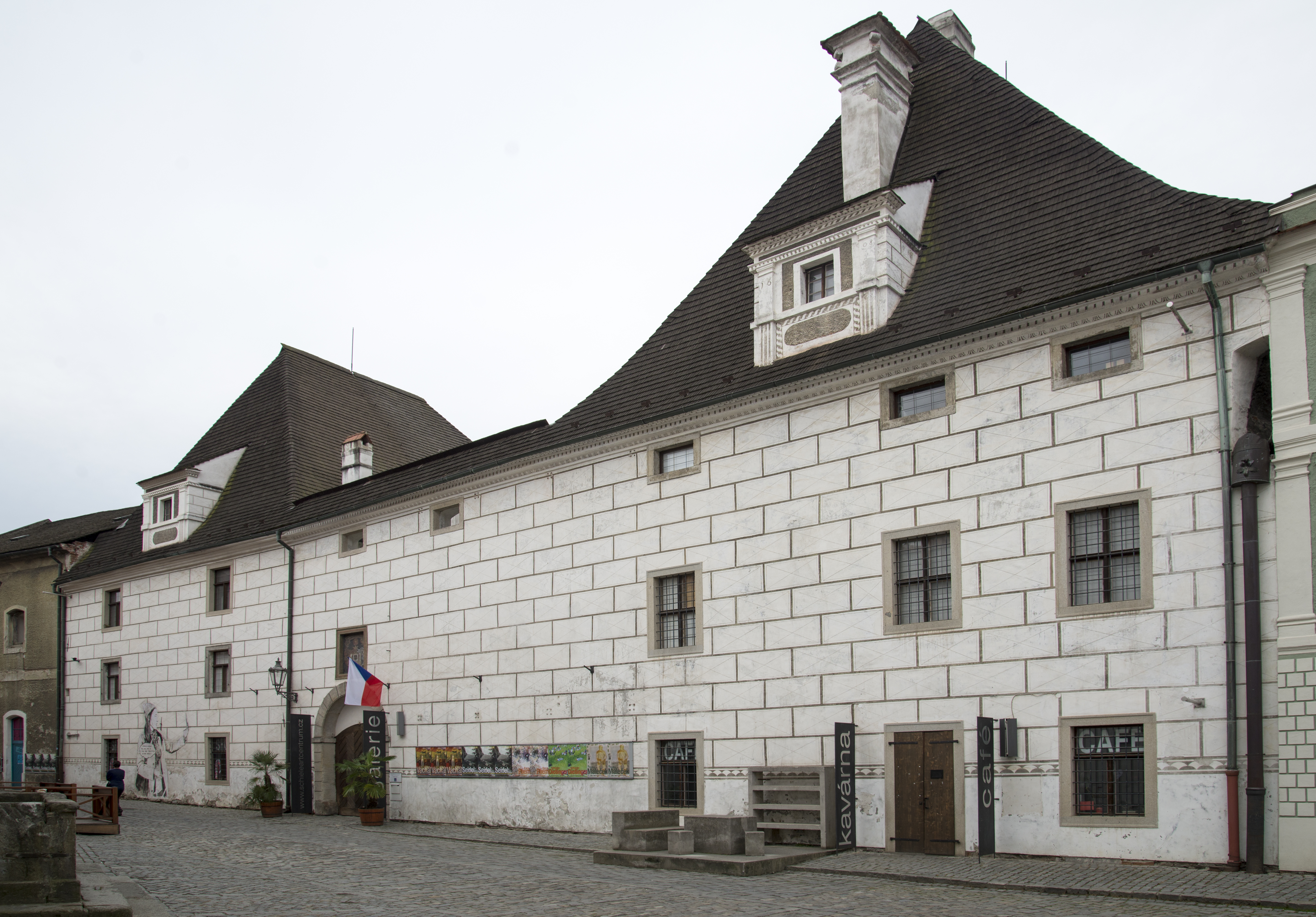
- Egon Schiele Art Centrum
- Interactive fullscreen map
- Established: 1992; 34 years ago
- Location: Široká 71, Český Krumlov, Czech Republic, 381 01
- Coordinates: 48°48′38.46″N 14°18′47.53″E
- Website: http://www.esac.cz/cz/egon_schiele_art_centrum/

The Egon Schiele Art Centrum (ESAC) is a museum and gallery devoted to the Austrian painter Egon Schiele in Krumau, Czech Republic.

== History ==
The Egon Schiele Art Centrum was established in 1992 by a group of Czechs, Austrians and Americans. Since 1993 it has presented a permanent exhibition of the works of Egon Schiele in addition to annual displays of 20th-century art by artists such as Picasso, Dalí, and Klimt.
