= Airport Tetovo =

Tetovo Airport Аеродром Тетово
- IATA: N/A; ICAO: N/A

Summary
- Airport type: Military / sports
- Owner/Operator: YPA
- Serves: Tetovo, North Macedonia
- Location: Zherovjane
- Elevation AMSL: 1,510 ft / 460 m
- Coordinates: 41°55′38.0″N 020°56′59.8″E
- Interactive map of Tetovo Airport; Аеродром Тетово

Runways
Direction	Length		Surface
Direction	ft	m	Surface
?	8,200	2,500	concrete

Airport Tetovo (Macedonian: Аеродром Тетово, Aerodrom Tetovo) was a military airport of YPA, most sophisticated on the Balkan Peninsula in that time. It was situated 8 km south from Tetovo, in the present North Macedonia, by the Tetovo-Gostivar highway and near the village of Zherovjane. Later on it was abandoned and open again as an airport for sport needs. Over time it was ruined and today there is no debris from the airport.
