= Brazda, Čučer-Sandevo =

Brazda Бразда
- Village
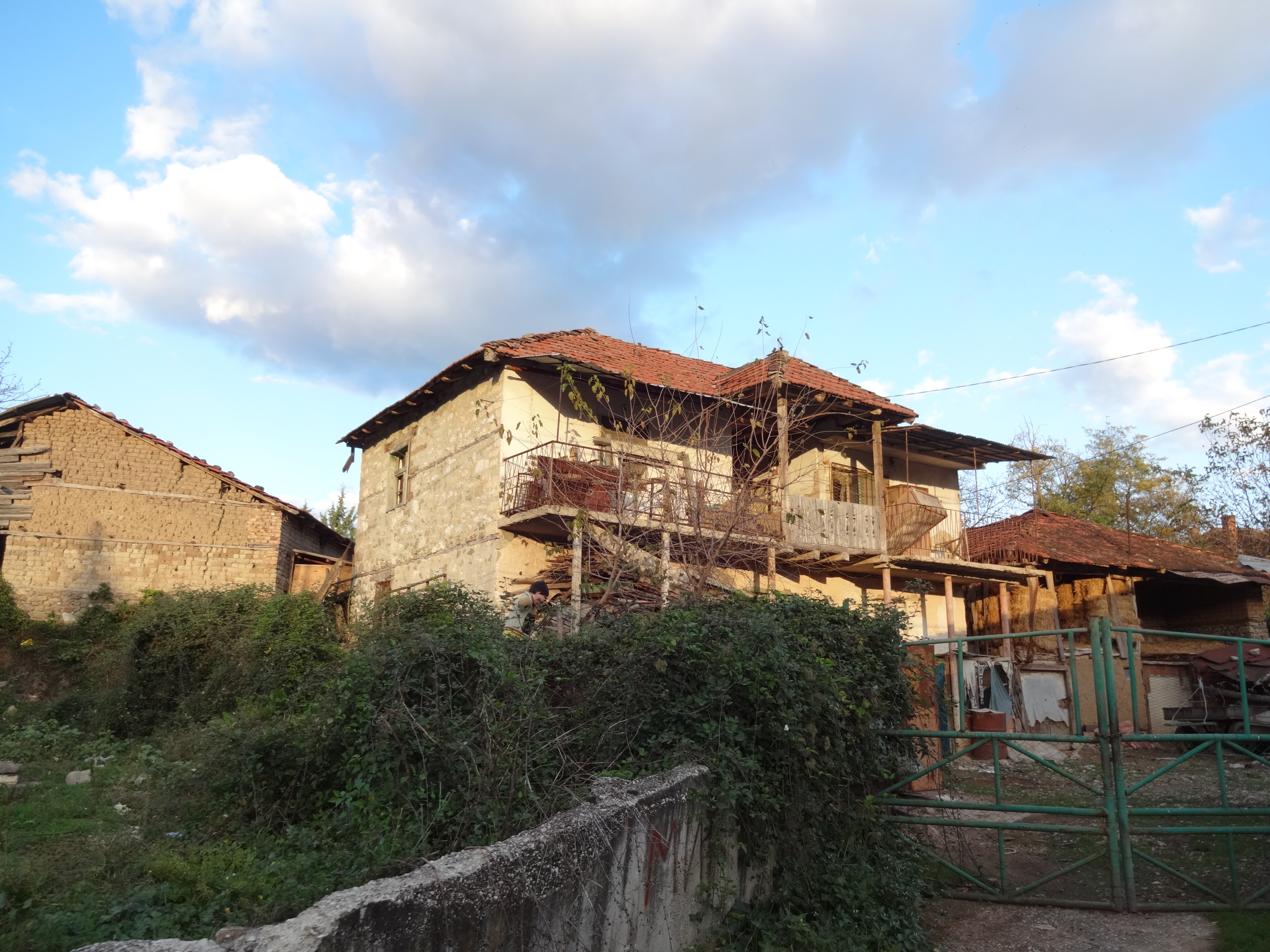

- Location within North Macedonia
- Coordinates: 42.080894°N 21.402561°E
- Country: North Macedonia
- Region: Skopje
- Municipality: Čučer-Sandevo

Population (2021)
  - Total: 647
- Time zone: UTC+1 (CET)
  - Summer (DST): UTC+2 (CEST)
- Website: .

Brazda (Macedonian: Бразда) is a village in the municipality of Čučer-Sandevo, North Macedonia.

== Demographics ==
As of the 2021 census, Brazda had 647 residents with the following ethnic composition:

- Macedonians 602
- Persons for whom data are taken from administrative sources 17
- Serbs 13
- Roma 9
- Others 6

According to the 2002 census, the village had a total of 480 inhabitants. Ethnic groups in the village include:

- Macedonians 470
- Serbs 5
- Others 5
