= Amelie Posse =

Swedish writer and anti-Nazi activist (1884–1957)

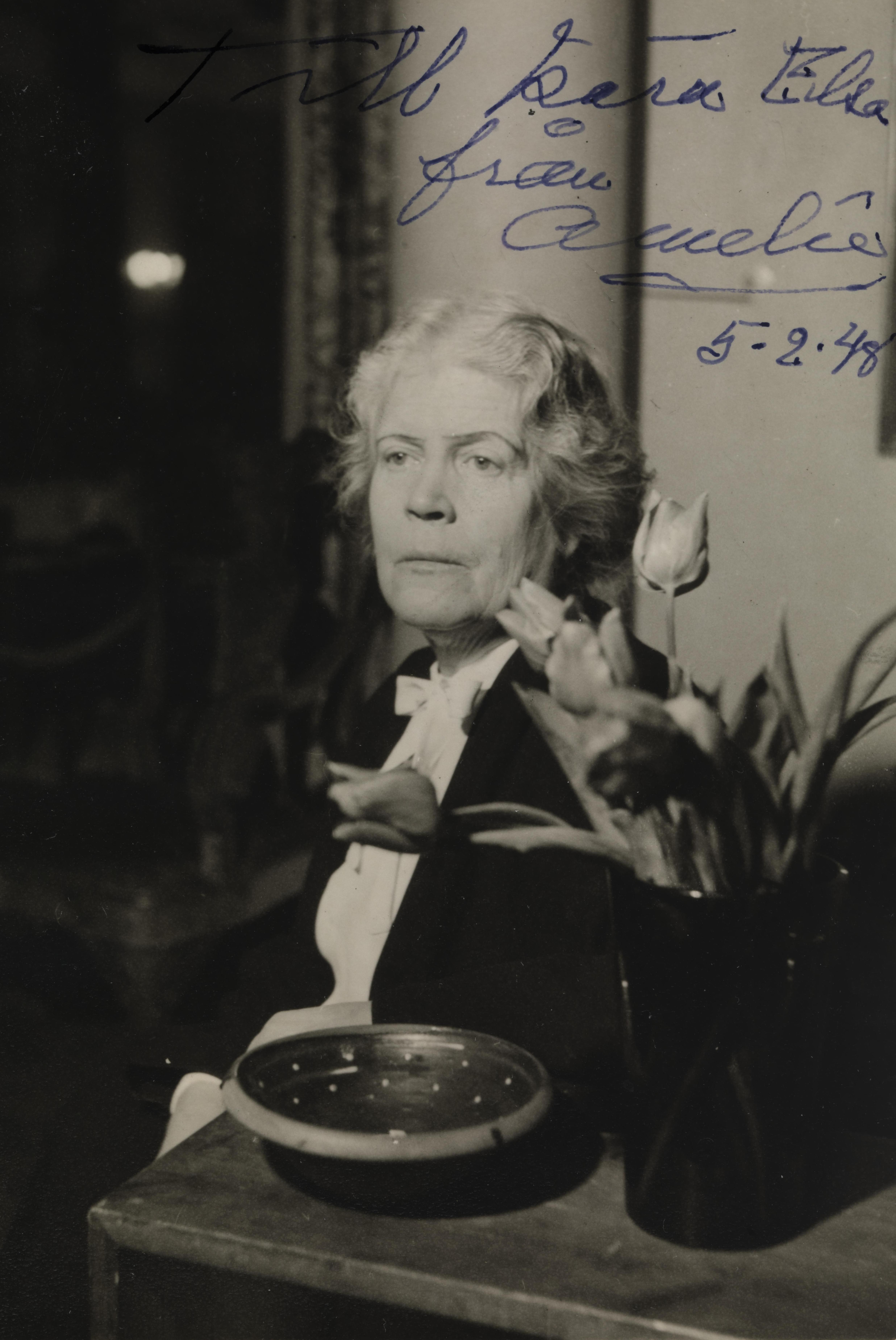
- Amelie Posse
- Born: Amelie Posse; 11 February 1884; Stockholm, Sweden
- Died: 3 March 1957 (aged 73); Stockholm, Sweden
- Occupations: Writer, journalist, political activist
- Spouse(s): Andreas Bjerre (1904–1912); Oskar Brázda (1915–1938)
- Children: 3, including Jan Brazda
- Writing career
- Language: Swedish

Amelie Posse-Brázdová (11 February 1884 – 3 March 1957) was a Swedish writer, journalist and political activist. Much of her literary work was autobiographical and reflected her experiences in Sweden, Italy and Czechoslovakia during the first half of the 20th century.

She lived for many years in Italy with her second husband, the Czech painter Oskar Brázda, and later in Czechoslovakia, where she became closely connected with figures including Tomáš Garrigue Masaryk and Edvard Beneš. A committed democrat and opponent of totalitarianism, she was active against Nazism during the Second World War and later opposed the Communist takeover of Czechoslovakia.

In Sweden she founded Tisdagsklubben ("The Tuesday Club") in 1940, an anti-Nazi discussion group intended to form part of a resistance network in the event of a German occupation of Sweden.

== Early life and education ==
Amelie Posse was born in Stockholm on 11 February 1884. She was the daughter of Count Fredrik Arvidsson Posse and Auda Gunhild Wennerberg and granddaughter of Arvid Posse, Prime Minister of Sweden from 1880 to 1883.

The family moved to Scania, where her father acquired the Maryhill estate near Glumslöv, between Helsingborg and Landskrona, close to what later became Örenäs Castle. Following her father's death in 1897, the family moved to Lund.

Posse received a broad cultural education and developed an early interest in languages, literature, music and painting. She initially considered becoming a concert pianist, but health problems affecting her hands prevented her from pursuing a professional career in music.

She subsequently studied art and music in Copenhagen.

== First marriage ==
In 1904 she married the Swedish criminal psychologist Andreas Bjerre. Their son, Sören Christer Bjerre, was born in 1905.

The marriage was unhappy and ended in divorce in 1912. Bjerre died in 1925.

After the divorce, Posse increasingly sought an independent life centred on her artistic and cultural interests.

== Italy ==
=== Rome and Villa Strohl-Fern ===
Posse moved to Rome, attracted by Italy's artistic heritage and by the international cultural life of the Italian capital.

She became associated with the cosmopolitan artistic community surrounding Villa Strohl Fern, an artists' colony near Villa Borghese founded by the Alsatian artist and philanthropist Alfred Wilhelm Strohl.

The villa accommodated numerous Italian and foreign painters, sculptors, writers, musicians and models and became one of the centres of the international artistic community in Rome during the early 20th century.

There Posse met the Czech painter Oskar Brázda, known as "Oki", who had studied at the Academy of Fine Arts Vienna and had moved to Italy on an imperial scholarship.

Posse and Brázda married in Rome in 1915.

Their years at Villa Strohl-Fern placed them within a diverse artistic and intellectual milieu that Posse later described extensively in her autobiographical writings.

=== First World War and Sardinia ===
Italy's entry into the First World War against Austria-Hungary dramatically changed the couple's situation. Brázda, as a Bohemian subject of the Austro-Hungarian Empire, was classified as an enemy alien, and Posse shared his legal status through marriage.

The couple were consequently interned in Alghero, Sardinia, where they remained for approximately a year during 1915–1916.

The experience brought Posse into contact with Sardinian society, landscapes and traditions, which differed greatly from the aristocratic and cosmopolitan environments in which she had previously lived.

The Sardinian episode later became the basis for her first major autobiographical book, Den oförlikneliga fångenskapen (1931). The work was published in English in 1932 as Sardinian Sideshow and brought Posse international attention.

An Italian edition, Interludio di Sardegna, was published in 1998.

=== Return to Rome ===
Following their release from internment, Posse and Brázda returned to Rome.

Their return coincided with Brázda's increasing involvement in the movement for an independent Czechoslovakia. Through Milan Rastislav Štefánik, Edvard Beneš and other members of the Czechoslovak independence movement, the couple became involved in political and cultural circles connected with the creation of the future Czechoslovak state.

Brázda worked with Štefánik in Rome and painted a portrait of Beneš there in 1917, now preserved by the Military History Institute Prague.

Posse herself became strongly attached to the Czechoslovak cause. Together with Brázda she was also involved in the artistic realisation of a Czechoslovak flag produced in Rome in May 1918, based on a concept associated with Štefánik.

After the war, Posse and Brázda continued living in Rome. Their home became part of a broad international network of artists, writers, musicians, diplomats and political figures.

The couple had two sons: Bohuslav "Slávo" Brázda, born in Rome in 1916, who later served as a Czechoslovak pilot in the Royal Air Force during the Second World War, and Jan Brázda, born in Rome in 1917, who became an artist, illustrator, stage designer and costume designer.

During these years the family lived for a period at Villa Cecchina near the Vatican. Posse's memories of Rome, its inhabitants and its artistic and social life became an important part of her later autobiographical writings, particularly Roman Roundabout and Further.

The family remained in Italy until 1925.

== Czechoslovakia ==
=== Líčkov Castle ===
In 1925 Posse and Brázda moved with their family to the newly established Czechoslovakia, a country with which both had developed strong political and personal ties.

They settled at Líčkov Castle, near Žatec, in an area with a substantial German-speaking population.

The castle required extensive restoration. It became both the family home and Brázda's artistic base, while Posse continued to develop her literary and political interests.

She maintained close relations with leading representatives of democratic Czechoslovakia, particularly President Tomáš Garrigue Masaryk and Edvard Beneš.

The years at Líčkov coincided with increasing political tensions in Central Europe and the rise of Nazism in neighbouring Germany.

Posse and Brázda divorced in 1938, although they remained in contact.

== Writer and political activist ==
Posse began publishing books relatively late in life. Her literary work was largely autobiographical and combined personal memories with observations on European society and politics.

Her first major success was Den oförlikneliga fångenskapen (1931), based on her wartime internment in Sardinia.

Her subsequent books reconstructed different periods of her life in Italy, Czechoslovakia and Sweden. Her writing was characterised by detailed portraits of people and places and by reflections on the political transformations of Europe during the first half of the 20th century.

She also wrote articles for newspapers and periodicals and became increasingly active in political and humanitarian causes.

== Return to Sweden and anti-Nazi activity ==
Following the German occupation of Czechoslovakia, Posse was threatened with arrest by the Gestapo. She left the country and returned to Sweden in 1939.

During the Second World War she became deeply involved in supporting Czechoslovak refugees and opponents of Nazism.

On 9 April 1940, the day Germany invaded Denmark and Norway, Posse founded Tisdagsklubben ("The Tuesday Club") in Stockholm, an anti-Nazi discussion group intended to form part of a resistance network in the event of a German occupation of Sweden.

Officially presented as a cultural discussion group, the organisation brought together Swedish intellectuals, journalists and public figures opposed to Nazism. It was also intended to function as part of an organised resistance network should Nazi Germany occupy Sweden.

German authorities considered Posse and other members of the organisation politically unreliable.

She also worked to assist refugees from occupied Czechoslovakia and maintained contacts with representatives of the Czechoslovak exile movement.

== Post-war Czechoslovakia and 1948 ==
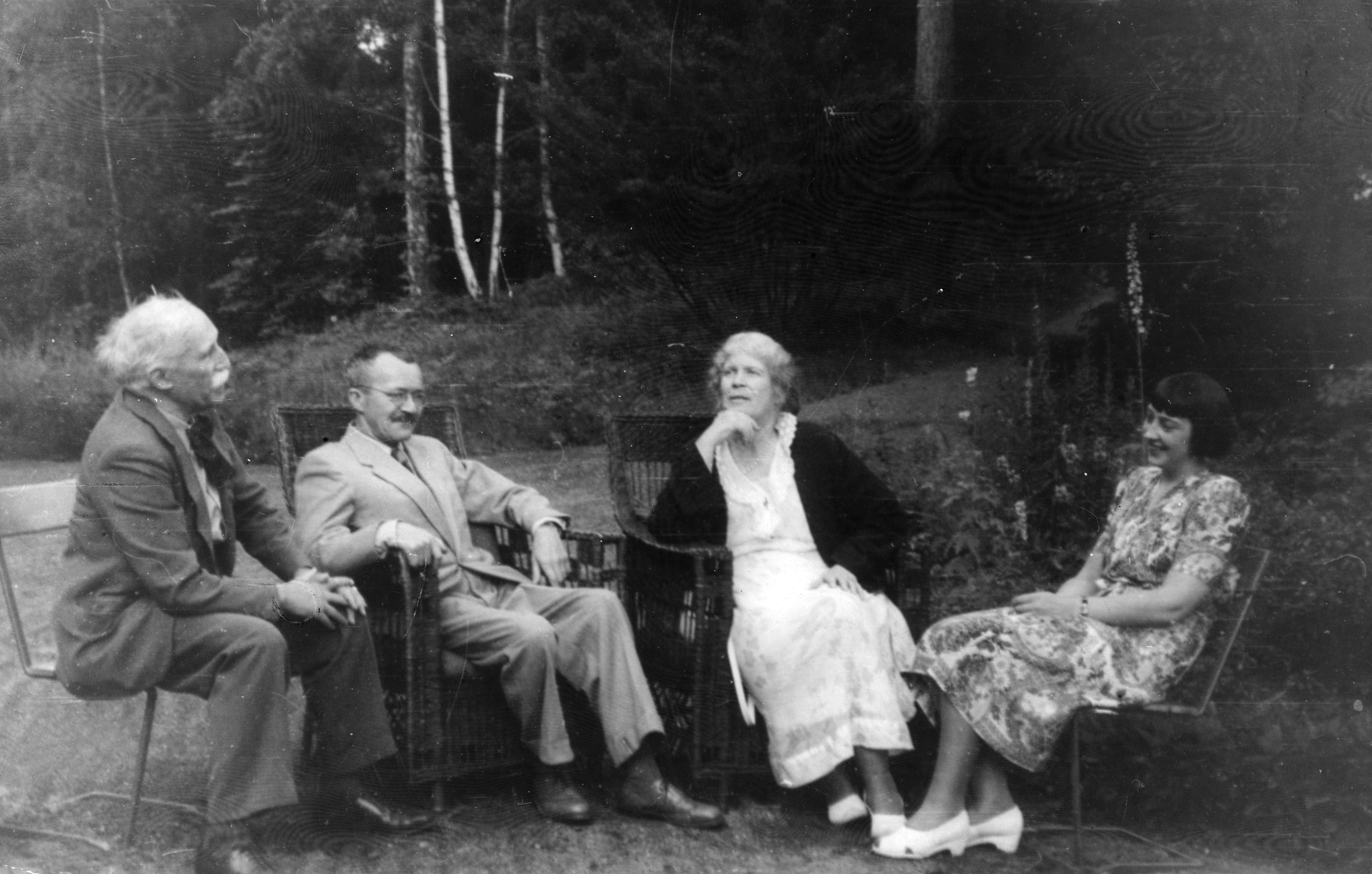

After the Second World War, Posse returned repeatedly to Czechoslovakia between 1946 and 1948.

Following the Communist coup of February 1948, she became increasingly involved in efforts to maintain contacts between democratic opponents of the new regime and Czechoslovak exiles abroad.

She collaborated with figures including Milada Horáková, one of the leading democratic politicians opposing the Communist takeover.

On 19 August 1948 Posse visited the seriously ill former president Edvard Beneš. According to Czech historical sources, she attempted to persuade him to leave Czechoslovakia. She subsequently also encouraged Horáková to leave the country.

Posse herself came under suspicion from the Czechoslovak State Security authorities and was forced to leave Czechoslovakia hurriedly in the autumn of 1948.

Her experiences during the Communist takeover were later documented in her correspondence and in the posthumously published När järnridån föll över Prag ("When the Iron Curtain Fell over Prague"), published in 1968 and edited by Barbro Alving.

Her letters from Prague in 1948 were later published in Czech as Tajné dopisy z Prahy.

== Later years ==
Posse continued writing and campaigning for democracy in Czechoslovakia after her return to Sweden.

In 1951–1952 she travelled abroad again, spending considerable time in Rome. These experiences were reflected in Minnenas park, published in 1954, the last of her books to appear during her lifetime.

Her later years were marked by declining health, although she continued writing and maintaining correspondence with friends and political contacts throughout Europe.

Amelie Posse died in Stockholm on 3 March 1957, aged 73.

She was buried at Odensvi church in Småland.

== Writing ==
Posse's literary work occupies a position between autobiography, memoir and literary fiction.

Her books frequently combine personal experience with portraits of historical personalities and observations of the political and social changes that transformed Europe during her lifetime.

Her years studying painting also influenced her literary style, which has been noted for its visual descriptions of people, landscapes and interiors.

Her writings provide eyewitness accounts of artistic life in early 20th-century Rome, wartime Sardinia, the establishment and later disintegration of democratic Czechoslovakia, anti-Nazi activity in neutral Sweden and the Communist takeover of Czechoslovakia.

== Selected works ==
- Den oförlikneliga fångenskapen (1931)
- Den brokiga friheten (1932)
- Sardinian Sideshow (1932), English translation
- Roman Roundabout (1933)
- Ned med vapnen! En kampsignal mot kriget (1935)
- Vidare (1936)
- Further (1938), English translation
- I begynnelsen var ljuset (1940)
- In the Beginning Was the Light (1942), English translation
- Bygga upp, ej riva neder (1942)
- Mellan slagen (1946)
- Kring kunskapens träd (1946)
- Kunskapens träd i blom (1946)
- Åtskilligt kan nu sägas (1949)
- Minnenas park (1954)
- När järnridån föll över Prag (1968), posthumous, edited by Barbro Alving
- Interludio di Sardegna (1998), Italian edition of Sardinian Sideshow
- Allegro Caprese (2000), posthumous

Her works have been translated into several languages, including English, Czech, Danish and Italian.

== Legacy ==
Posse is remembered in Sweden for her autobiographical writing and her anti-Nazi activities, and in the Czech Republic for her long-standing support for democratic Czechoslovakia.

Her life connected the cultural and political histories of Sweden, Italy and Czechoslovakia during a period encompassing both world wars, the creation of Czechoslovakia, the rise of Nazism and the Communist takeover of 1948.

A collection of her papers, including extensive correspondence, is preserved by the National Library of Sweden.

Material relating to Posse is also preserved at Örenäs in southern Sweden, close to the area where she spent part of her childhood.

== Sources ==
- Levander, Hans. "Posse-Brázdová, Amelie". Svenska män och kvinnor, vol. 6. Stockholm: Albert Bonniers Förlag, 1949.
- Lövgren, Britta. "Posse, Amelie". Svenskt Biografiskt Lexikon. Stockholm, 1996.
- Bokholm, Rune. Tisdagsklubben: Om glömda antinazistiska sanningssägare i svenskt 30-40-tal. Stockholm: Atlantis, 2001.
- Strömberg Krantz, Eva. En ande som hör jorden till: en bok om Amelie Posse. Stockholm: Carlsson, 2010.
- Strömberg Krantz, Eva. Amelie Posse-Brázdová: Život spjatý s Československem. Prague: Akropolis, 2011.
