= Oskar Brázda =

Czech painter (1887–1977)

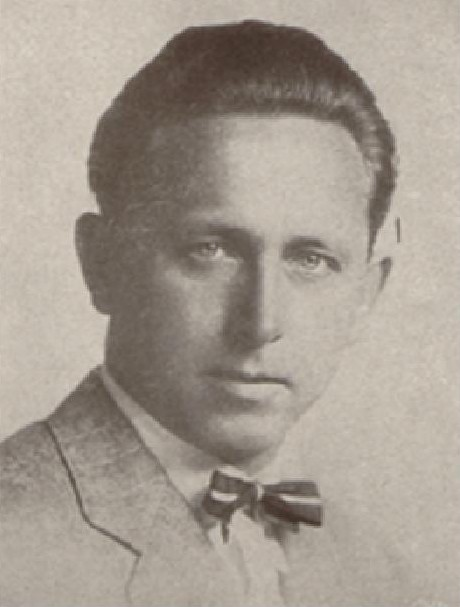
- Oskar Brázda
- Born: 30 September 1887; Rosice, Austria-Hungary
- Died: 19 December 1977 (aged 90); Líčkov, Czechoslovakia
- Education: Academy of Fine Arts Vienna
- Known for: Painting, portraiture
- Movement: Secessione Romana
- Spouse(s): Amelie Posse (m. 1915; div. 1938); Marie Weiss
- Children: 2, including Bohuslav "Slávo" Brázda and Jan Brazda

Signature
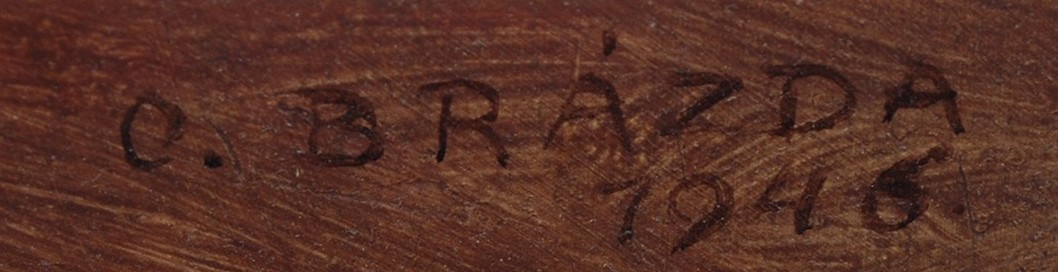

Oskar Brázda (30 September 1887 – 19 December 1977) was a Czech painter and portraitist who spent a significant part of his early career in Italy. He was active in the artistic milieu of early 20th-century Rome and became involved in the Czechoslovak independence movement during the First World War, coming into contact with leading figures of the movement including Milan Rastislav Štefánik, Edvard Beneš and Tomáš Garrigue Masaryk.

Brázda was married from 1915 to 1938 to the Swedish writer and political activist Amelie Posse. The couple lived for many years in Italy, were interned in Alghero, Sardinia, during the First World War, and later settled at Líčkov Castle in Czechoslovakia. They had two sons. Their elder son, Bohuslav "Slávo" Brázda (13 September 1916 – 1991), was born in Rome and later served as a Czechoslovak fighter pilot in the Royal Air Force during the Second World War, attaining the rank of Flight Sergeant.

Their younger son, Jan Brázda (1917–2012), became an artist, illustrator and internationally active stage and costume designer.

== Early life and education ==
Brázda was born on 30 September 1887 in Rosice, then part of Austria-Hungary, to Bohumil Brázda and Božena Brázdová, née Havránková. His father worked in the hospitality business. The family moved several times and in 1895 settled in Prague, where his father was, among other activities, associated with the operation of Café Slavia.

Brázda attended secondary school in Prague before entering the Academy of Fine Arts Vienna in 1904. His teachers included Rudolf Bacher and the Polish painter Kazimierz Pochwalski. After completing his studies he received an imperial scholarship which enabled him to continue his artistic education in Italy.

== Italy and Rome ==
Brázda settled in Italy during the years preceding the First World War and became part of the international artistic community of Rome. Between approximately 1912 and 1925 he was associated with the Secessione Romana and with artistic currents influenced by Fauvism.

During his Roman period he frequented the artistic environment of Villa Strohl Fern, the artists' colony close to Villa Borghese that hosted numerous Italian and foreign painters, sculptors, writers and intellectuals.

In Rome Brázda met the Swedish writer and aristocrat Amelie Posse. They married in Rome in 1915.

== First World War and Sardinia ==
Following Italy's entry into the First World War against Austria-Hungary in 1915, Brázda's status as an Austro-Hungarian subject resulted in his internment as an enemy alien.

Brázda and Posse were interned in the Sardinian town of Alghero in 1915–1916. Their experience in Sardinia was later described by Posse in her autobiographical book Den oförlikneliga fångenskapen, published in English as Sardinian Sideshow.

After their release, the couple returned to Rome.

== Czechoslovak independence movement ==
After returning from Sardinia, Brázda became involved in the movement for an independent Czechoslovak state.

In Rome he met Milan Rastislav Štefánik, who had arrived in Italy in connection with his political and diplomatic activities. Štefánik established an office at Via Boncompagni 93 and appointed Brázda as his secretary.

Brázda also became acquainted with Edvard Beneš and participated in the activities of the first Czechoslovak resistance abroad.

In 1917 Brázda painted a portrait of Beneš in Rome. The work is preserved in the collections of the Military History Institute Prague (Vojenský historický ústav Praha).

Brázda and Posse were also connected with the visual representation of the Czechoslovak independence movement in Italy. The Military History Institute Prague has documented a flag produced in Rome in May 1918 whose final artistic design was executed by Oskar Brázda and Amelie Posse-Brázdová on the basis of an idea attributed to Štefánik. The flag has been described by the institute as an important predecessor in the development of Czechoslovak state symbolism.

Brázda subsequently maintained close relations with leading figures of the newly established Czechoslovakia. In 1921 and 1922 he spent holidays on Capri with President Tomáš Garrigue Masaryk, with whom he maintained a long friendship.

== Artistic career in Italy ==
Following the First World War, Brázda achieved considerable success as a portrait painter in Italy, particularly among Roman aristocratic and upper-class circles.

His Roman studio attracted personalities from the worlds of politics, diplomacy, literature, music and art. Czech biographical sources report visitors and sitters associated with his Roman period including Prince Eugen of Sweden, conductor Arturo Toscanini, writer Grazia Deledda, Edvard Beneš, Milan Rastislav Štefánik and Benito Mussolini.

In 1924 Brázda held a major exhibition in Rome which was inaugurated by Mussolini. During the same year Brázda received the Order of the Crown of Italy and was received by King Victor Emmanuel III.

The first Italian monograph devoted to Brázda was written by Giovanni Marini and published in 1924.

Brázda's works entered several Italian collections. Czech sources identify works in collections including the Galleria Nazionale d'Arte Moderna in Rome, collections in Sassari, the National Museum of Musical Instruments in Rome and the University of Padua.

== Return to Czechoslovakia ==
In 1925 Brázda and Posse left Italy and moved with their family to the newly established Czechoslovakia.

They acquired the Baroque Líčkov Castle, near Žatec, which had reportedly been unoccupied for several decades. The couple restored the property and settled there with their two sons, Bohuslav and Jan.

Líčkov became Brázda's principal artistic base, and he continued to work there as a painter and portraitist.

Brázda and Posse divorced in 1938. Despite the end of their marriage, they remained in contact in later years.

== Second World War and Communist period ==
Following the German occupation of Czechoslovakia, Brázda was forced to leave Líčkov Castle and spent a period in prison. According to Czech biographical sources, he was released following intervention from abroad.

After the Second World War he returned to Líčkov.

Following the Communist takeover of Czechoslovakia in 1948, the castle was nationalised. Brázda also lost part of his collection of paintings in connection with the so-called millionaire's levy, but was allowed to continue living at Líčkov.

He remained there for the rest of his life.

Brázda later married Marie Weiss, who had been his model and long-term companion.

== Later life and death ==
Brázda continued painting into old age. On his 90th birthday in 1977 he received the Czechoslovak honorary title of Merited Artist (Zasloužilý umělec).

He died at Líčkov on 19 December 1977, aged 90.

Following the political changes of 1989, his second wife Marie Weiss-Brázdová recovered property through restitution and established the Oskar Brázda Gallery at Líčkov Castle, displaying works and personal objects associated with the painter.

== Artistic legacy ==
Brázda's career developed across Czech, Austrian and Italian artistic environments. His Italian period, from approximately 1912 to 1925, was particularly important to his development and reputation.

He participated in the Roman artistic scene and became known especially for portraiture. Contemporary accounts of his work appeared in Italian as well as British, Swedish, French and German publications.

His departure from Italy in 1925 interrupted a successful career in the country, and his later work became more closely associated with Czechoslovakia.

Brázda is also remembered for his involvement with the Czechoslovak independence movement in Italy and for his personal and professional relationships with Štefánik, Beneš and Masaryk.

Brázda and Posse divorced in 1938. He later married Marie Weiss.

== Selected bibliography ==
- Tomeš, Josef, et al. Český biografický slovník XX. století. Vol. I. Prague and Litomyšl: Paseka, 1999. ISBN 80-7185-245-7.
- Vošahlíková, Pavla, et al. Biografický slovník českých zemí. Vol. 7. Prague: Libri, 2007. ISBN 978-80-7277-248-3.
- Rakušanová, Marie. Bytosti odnikud: metamorfózy akademických principů v malbě první poloviny 20. století v Čechách. Prague: Academia, 2008. ISBN 978-80-200-1648-5.
- Koudelka, Ivo. Oskar Brázda a jeho dvě múzy: Amelie Posse a Maria Weiss. Prague: Regulus, 2015. ISBN 978-80-86279-49-7.
- Havelka, Ivan; Koudelka, Ivo; Russo, Alessandro. Fenomén Oskar Brázda. Prague: Regulus, 2017. ISBN 978-80-86279-58-9.
- Špecinger, Otakar. Oskar Brázda. Kralupy nad Vltavou: R press, 1992.
- Špecinger, Otakar. Malíř Oskar Brázda a zámek Líčkov. Prague: Regulus, 1996.
- Strömberg Krantz, Eva. Amelie Posse-Brázdová: Život spjatý s Československem. Prague: Akropolis, 2011.

== In the writings of Amelie Posse ==
Brázda and his life with Amelie Posse in Italy and Czechoslovakia are extensively described in several of Posse's autobiographical works, including:

- Den oförlikneliga fångenskapen (1931), published in English as

 Sardinian Sideshow

- Vidare (1936), published in English as Further
- I begynnelsen var ljuset (1940), published in English as

 Roman Roundabout

== See also ==
- Amelie Posse
- Milan Rastislav Štefánik
- Edvard Beneš
- Tomáš Garrigue Masaryk
- Czechoslovak Legion in Italy
- Secessione Romana
