= Bagljaš =

Coordinates: 45.382°N 20.366°E

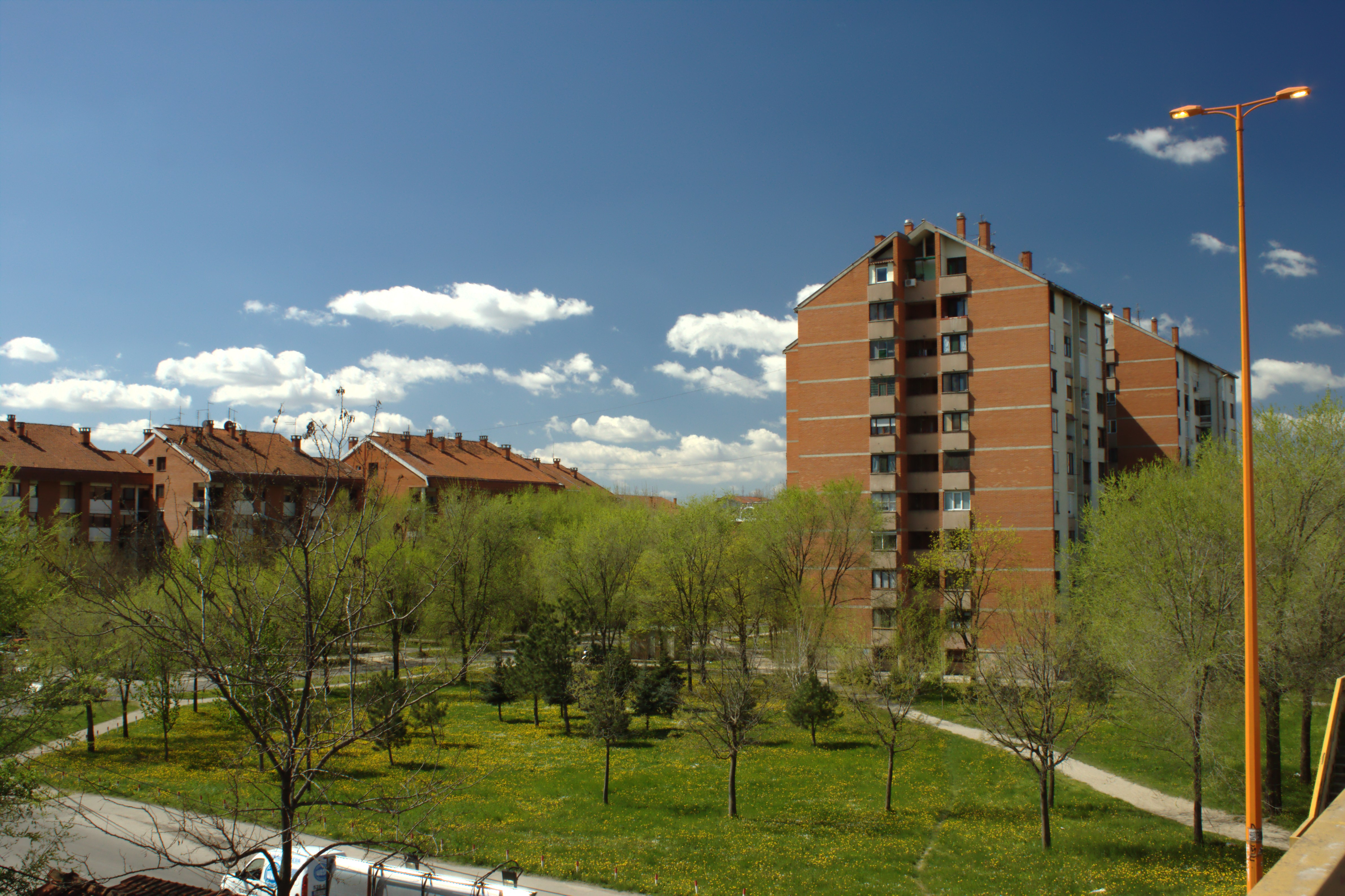
Apartment buildings in Bagljaš

Bagljaš (Serbian: Багљаш) is a part of the city of Zrenjanin. It is named after a Slovak family named Bagljas which used to have vineyards in that area. The family still has descendants in the village of Aradac. One part of the area was a graveyard, that during World War II, became a place where fascist occupiers systematically killed partisans and patriots. A monument has been erected and the graveyard removed.

== History and description ==
Bagljaš was urbanized after the Second World War as a "city inside a city" so that it has a particular urban wholeness. It consists of the New and Old Bagljaš, which are separated by the Boulevard of Veljko Vlahović. It is often considered as Zrenjanin's version of the New Belgrade.

Bagljas has more than 20,000 inhabitants and is the biggest part of Zrenjanin. There is a primary school, "Petar Petrovic Njegoš", kindergarten "Crvenkapica", a health centre and a new secondary medical school. It lies on the exit from Zrenjanin towards Novi Sad. City's Hospital is located at the entrance of Bagljas. West of Bagljas is located a new urban industrial zone and new commercial centre. Administratively, the neighbourhood is split into two: the North, called after the Sonja Marinković and the South, Veljko Vlahović.

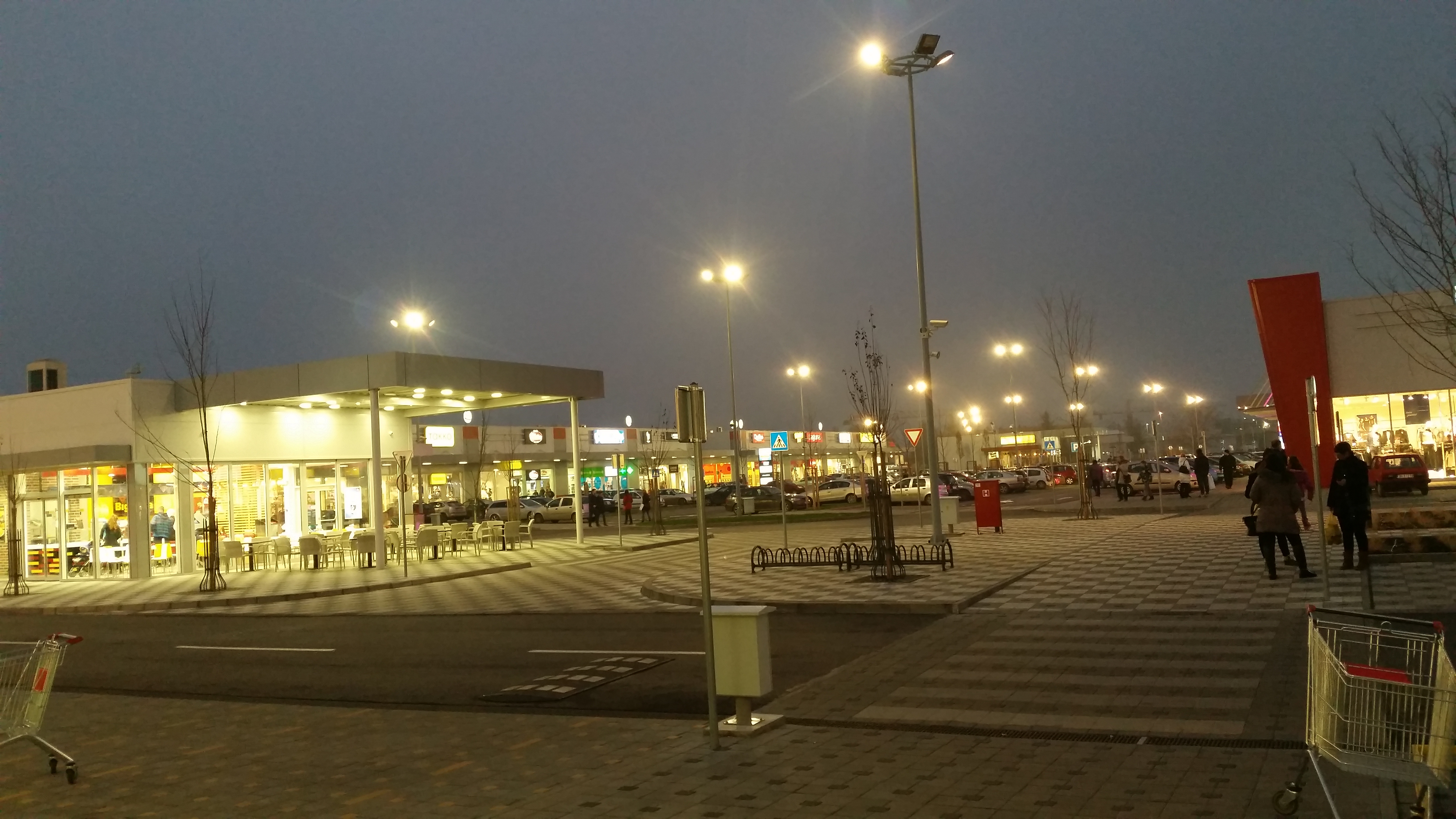
New shopping mall

"Aviv Park", the Zrenjanin's only shopping mall, has opened in Bagljas in 2015. The most advanced five-star cinema in Serbia with four multiplex screens, "Cinestar" is located within Bagljas.

There is also a Zrenjanin sport airport, where famous competitions of scooter such as European Championship in free flying.

Orthodox Church "Ascension of Christ" is being built in Bagljas, the first orthodox temple in Zrenjanin after 200 years.

Some notable people from this part of Zrenjanin include:

Ivana Španović (Olympic medal winning long jumper)

Zvonimir Vujin (Boxer)

Petar 'Peromir' Popov (early pioneer football player)
