= Steinbach an der Steyr =

- Municipality
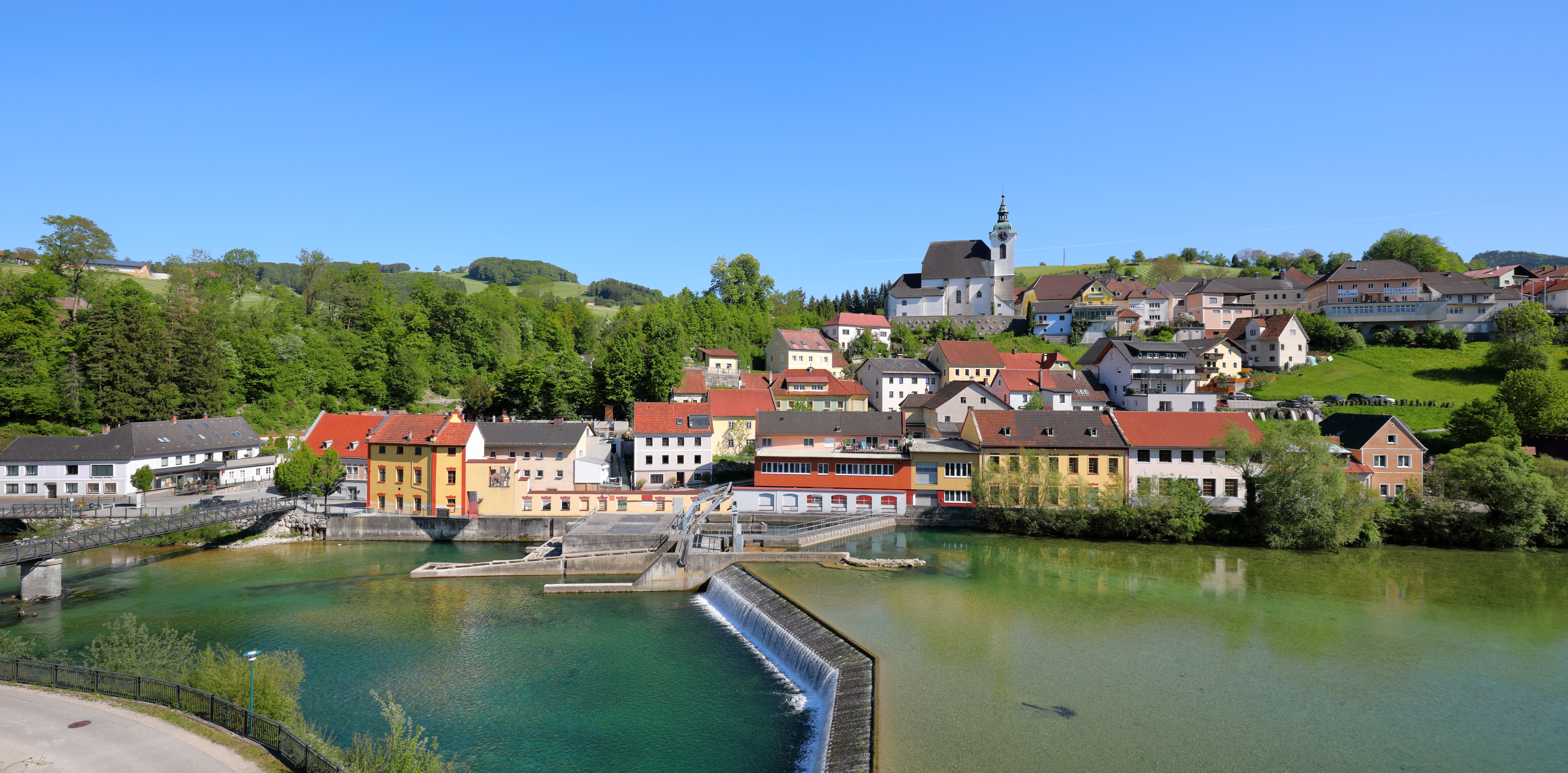

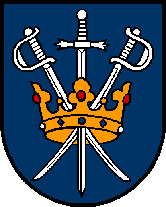
- Coat of arms

- Location within Austria
- Coordinates: 47°58′16″N 14°16′01″E
- Country: Austria
- State: Upper Austria
- District: Kirchdorf an der Krems

Government
  - Mayor: Christian Dörfel (ÖVP)

Area
  - Total: 28.23 km^{2} (10.90 sq mi)
- Elevation: 381 m (1,250 ft)

Population (2018-01-01)
  - Total: 2,009
  - Density: 71.17/km^{2} (184.3/sq mi)
- Time zone: UTC+1 (CET)
  - Summer (DST): UTC+2 (CEST)
- Postal code: 4594
- Area code: 07257
- Vehicle registration: KI
- Website: www.steinbachsteyr.at

Steinbach an der Steyr is a municipality in the district of Kirchdorf an der Krems in the Austrian state of Upper Austria.

== Geography and geology ==
Steinbach is in the valley of the river Steyr. It is 381 metres (1,250 ft) above sea level and 20 kilometres (12 mi) south of the town Steyr. 36.0% of its area is wood, 53.7% of the area is used for agriculture. The highest hill is the Hochbuchberg (1,273 metres (4,177 ft)). The nearby lodge Grünburger Hütte is 1,080 metres (3,540 ft). The community area is divided into four subparts: Steinbach, Pieslwang, Forstau and Zehetner. Nearby communities are Grünburg, Ternberg, Aschach an der Steyr, Waldneukirchen and Molln.

The river Steyr on the west side of the community is embedded in deep carved gravel terraces with a few sand banks. The canyon is mostly natural and the water quality is excellent. Its cold temperature of 16 °C (61 °F) maximum and strong currents make the shallow river dangerous at several sections.

== Emblem ==
The emblem of Steinbach is a jewelled golden crown in front of blue background. Two crossed rapiers and a standing sword are plotted through the crown. The colors of the community are blue and yellow.

== History ==
In the 11th century the area was part of Styria under Ottokar I of Styria. A tower or a castle was built on the top of a slope beside the Steyr. At the end of the 12th century the area became part of the dukedom of Austria under the Babenbergers. The castle was not needed anymore and its stones were used for a church for the growing village. A staircase and a farm still reflect the castle in their names. Old stories mention a tunnel between the castle and a second building.

The village contained farms and handicraft enterprises. The farmers were bondsmen. They had to give the tenth part of their harvest to the owners of the farm. The name Zehetner reflects this till today. The handicraft enterprises used water power to work with iron. The metal was brought over the nearby river Enns from Styria. The handicraft enterprises lasted until the 1960s. The community emblem was originally the emblem of the craftsmen. They were named "Messerer". Some old buildings on the riverside still show the emblem. Today a small power plant and a museum also mark their elapsed working place.

== Places of interest ==
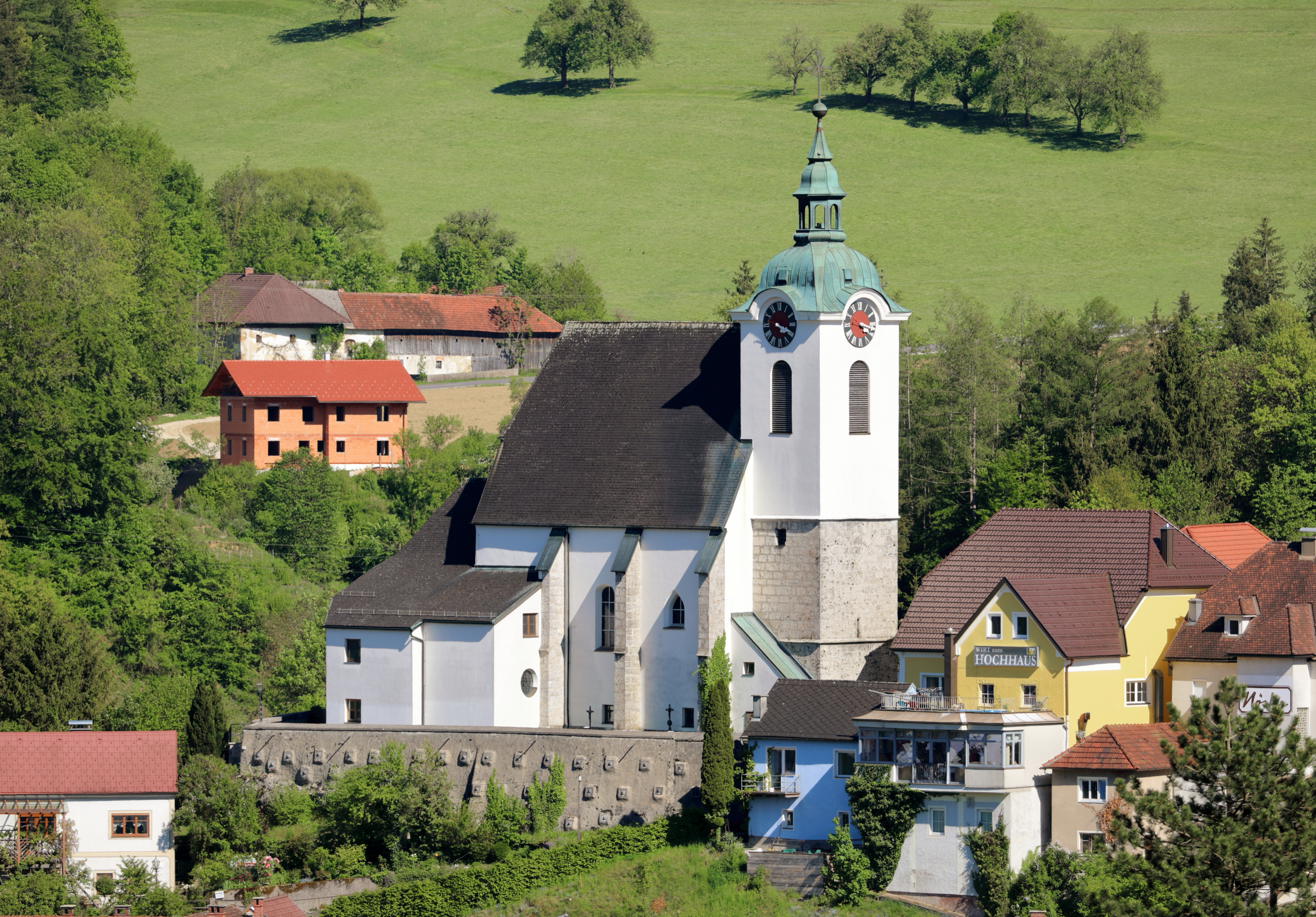
Parish church

- Steyrtalbahn museum train to Steyr (bike waggon included)
- metal work museum
- nativity set museum (230 sets from 70 countries)
- church: late gothic with colored windows (1460), partly baroque (1692)
- old rectory
- View over Upper Austria on the Krahberg

== Sports ==
- Beach volleyball
- Fistball
- Soccer (Union Grünburg Steinbach)
- Motocross
- Biking
- Horse Riding
- Schwimming (open air pool)
- Tennis
- Table tennis
- Hiking (Grünburger Hütte, Kruckenbrettl)

== Events ==
- 1.May-festive day
- Perchten lauf (ancient customs)
- Advent market, singing and calendar
- Ortslauf (running event)

== Traffic ==
- Public Traffic: The museum train Steyrtalbahn can be used to travel to Steyr partly regularly on Sundays and holy days. A bus route to Bad Hall starts nearby the center. Bus routes to Steyr, Kirchdorf an der Krems, Sierning can be taken in Grünburg at the museum train station.
- Car: Steinbach is nearby the state road B140 which goes through Grünburg. A district road leads to Ternberg. The highway A9 can be reached at Sattledt or at Klaus.
- Bike: A family friendly part of the bicycle path through the valley of the river Steyr leads to the south to Klaus. An alternative route leads to Molln. In the other direction the bicycle path leads to Steyr. The bicycle through the valley of the river Enns can be reached by using the steep district street to Ternberg.

== Economy ==
Enterprises

- Transportunternehmen Steiner (transport)
- Rosensteiner GmbH (farming machines)
- Steinbacher Tischlerei (cabinetmaking)
- Steinbacher Versicherung (insurance)

== Public buildings ==
- Library (Center)
- Tourism information (Library)
- Open air pool
- Pils Halle (Festival Center)

== Schools ==
- Playschool
- Primary school
- Music school
