= Wartberg an der Krems =

- Municipality
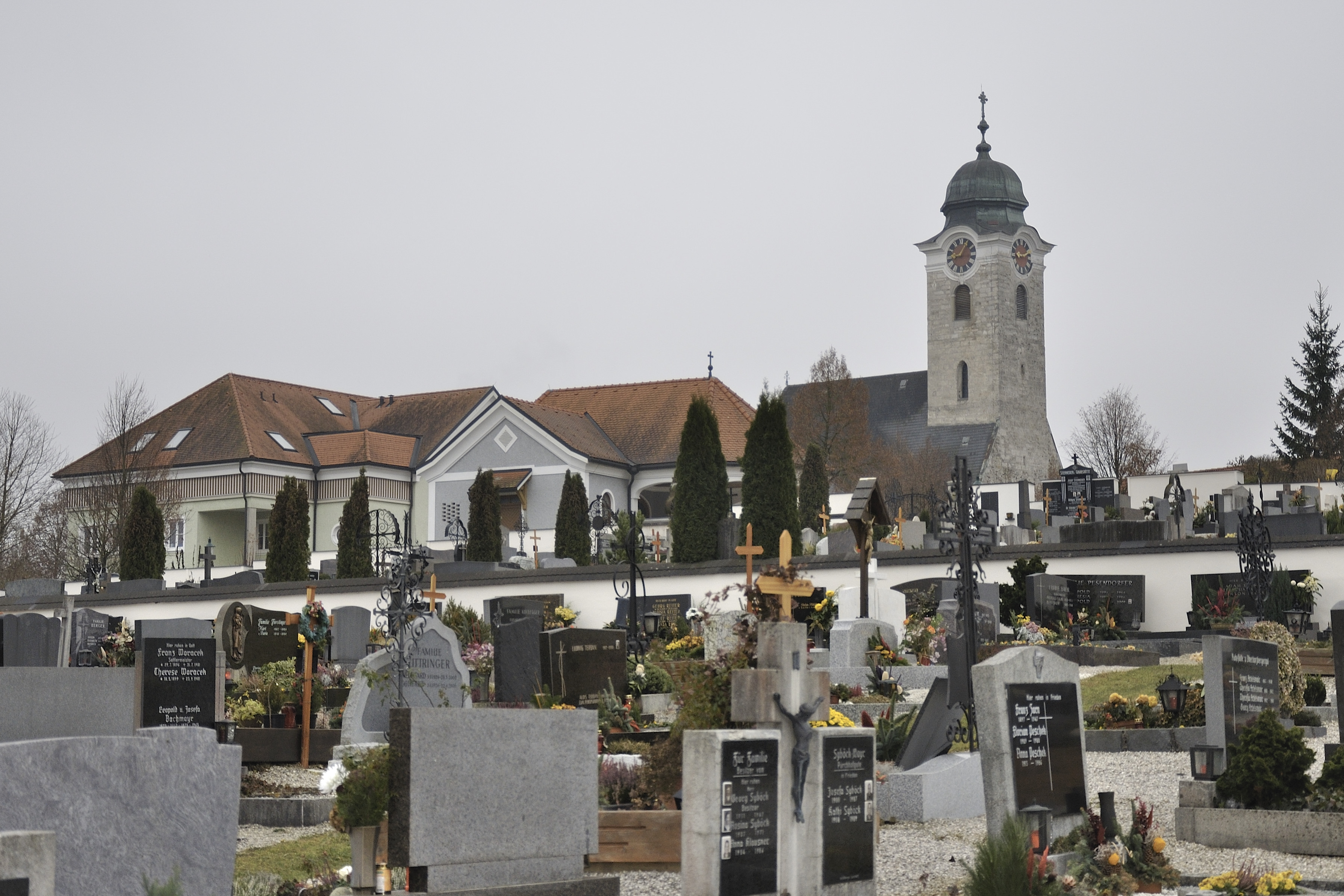

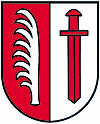
- Coat of arms

- Location within Austria
- Coordinates: 47°59′24″N 14°07′01″E
- Country: Austria
- State: Upper Austria
- District: Kirchdorf an der Krems

Government
  - Mayor: Franz Karlhuber (ÖVP)

Area
  - Total: 31.57 km^{2} (12.19 sq mi)
- Elevation: 385 m (1,263 ft)

Population (2018-01-01)
  - Total: 2,993
  - Density: 94.81/km^{2} (245.5/sq mi)
- Time zone: UTC+1 (CET)
  - Summer (DST): UTC+2 (CEST)
- Postal code: 4552
- Area code: 07587
- Vehicle registration: KI
- Website: www.wartberg.at

Wartberg an der Krems is a municipality in the district of Kirchdorf an der Krems in the Austrian state of Upper Austria.

== Population ==
Historical population
Year	Pop.	±%
1869	2,157	—
1900	2,082	−3.5%
1923	2,140	+2.8%
1951	2,465	+15.2%
1971	2,376	−3.6%
1981	2,410	+1.4%
1991	2,612	+8.4%
2001	3,011	+15.3%
2008	2,985	−0.9%
