= Vorderstoder =

- Municipality
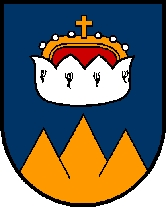
- Coat of arms

- Location within Austria
- Coordinates: 47°42′45″N 14°13′31″E
- Country: Austria
- State: Upper Austria
- District: Kirchdorf an der Krems

Government
  - Mayor: Gerhard Lindbichler (ÖVP)

Area
  - Total: 37.12 km^{2} (14.33 sq mi)
- Elevation: 810 m (2,660 ft)

Population (2018-01-01)
  - Total: 810
  - Density: 22/km^{2} (57/sq mi)
- Time zone: UTC+1 (CET)
  - Summer (DST): UTC+2 (CEST)
- Postal code: 4574
- Area code: 07564
- Vehicle registration: KI
- Website: www.vorderstoder.at

Vorderstoder is a municipality in the district of Kirchdorf an der Krems in the Austrian state of Upper Austria.

== Geography ==
Vorderstoder lies in the Traunviertel. About 55 percent of the municipality is forest, and 25 percent is farmland.
