= Roßleithen =

- Municipality
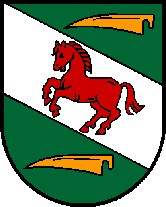
- Coat of arms

- Location within Austria
- Coordinates: 47°43′29″N 14°18′36″E
- Country: Austria
- State: Upper Austria
- District: Kirchdorf an der Krems

Government
  - Mayor: Gabriele Dittersdorfer (SPÖ)

Area
  - Total: 67.49 km^{2} (26.06 sq mi)
- Elevation: 588 m (1,929 ft)

Population (2018-01-01)
  - Total: 1,889
  - Density: 27.99/km^{2} (72.49/sq mi)
- Time zone: UTC+1 (CET)
  - Summer (DST): UTC+2 (CEST)
- Postal code: 4580
- Area code: 07562
- Vehicle registration: KI
- Website: www.rossleithen.at

Roßleithen is a municipality in the district of Kirchdorf an der Krems in the Austrian state of Upper Austria.

== Geography ==
Roßleithen lies in the Traunviertel. About 61 percent of the municipality is forest, and 20 percent is farmland.
