= Steyr Valley Railway =

Coordinates: 48°02′25″N 14°23′10″E

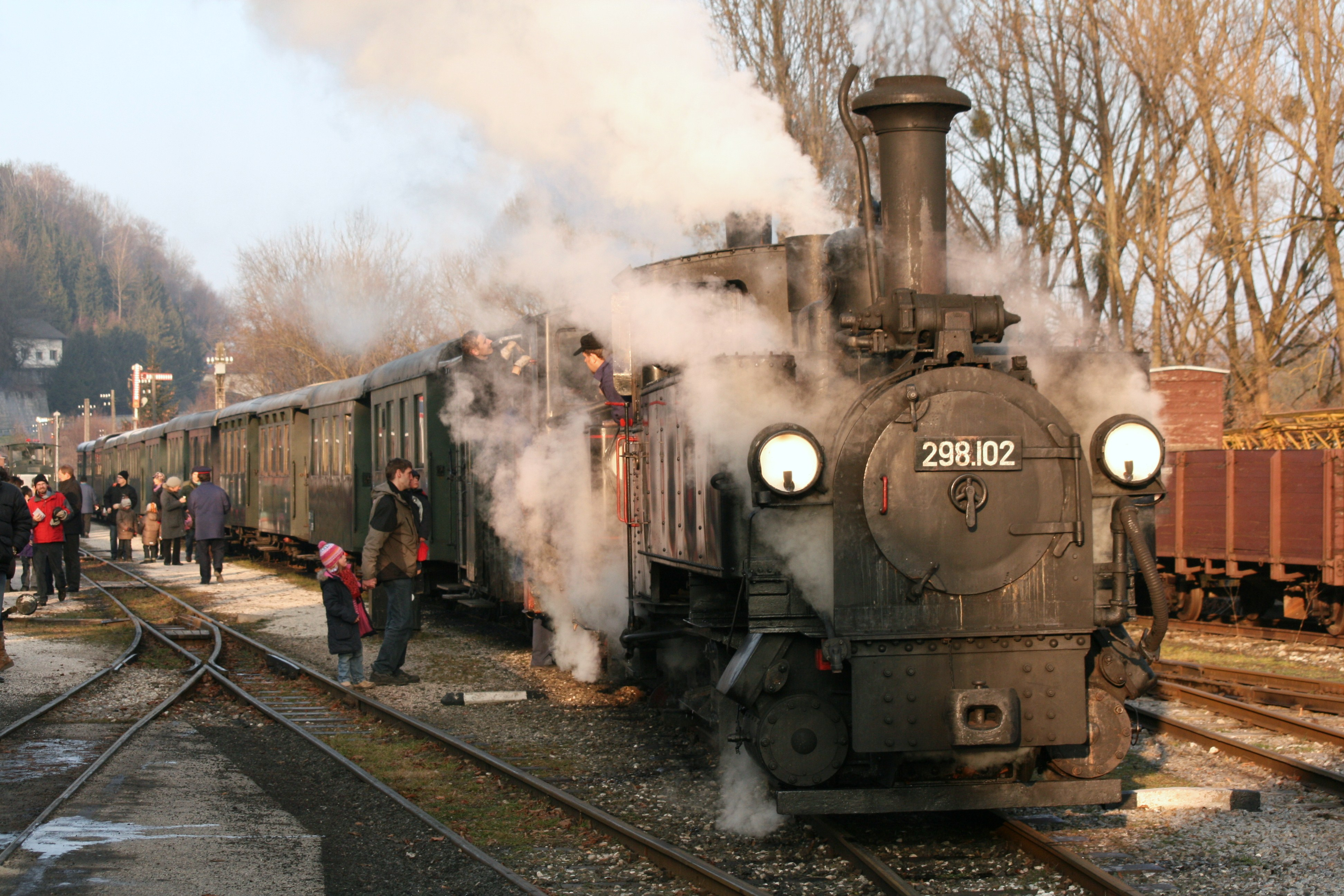
A train of the Steyr Valley Railwayat the station stop in Grünburg on 31 December 2008.

The Steyr Valley Railway (German: Steyrtalbahn) was a 760 mm (2 ft 5 15/16 in) narrow gauge railway in Upper Austria, which ran along the valley of the River Steyr from Garsten through Steyr, Grünburg and Molln to Klaus, with a branchline to Sierning and Bad Hall. A section of the line has been retained as a museum railway.

== History ==
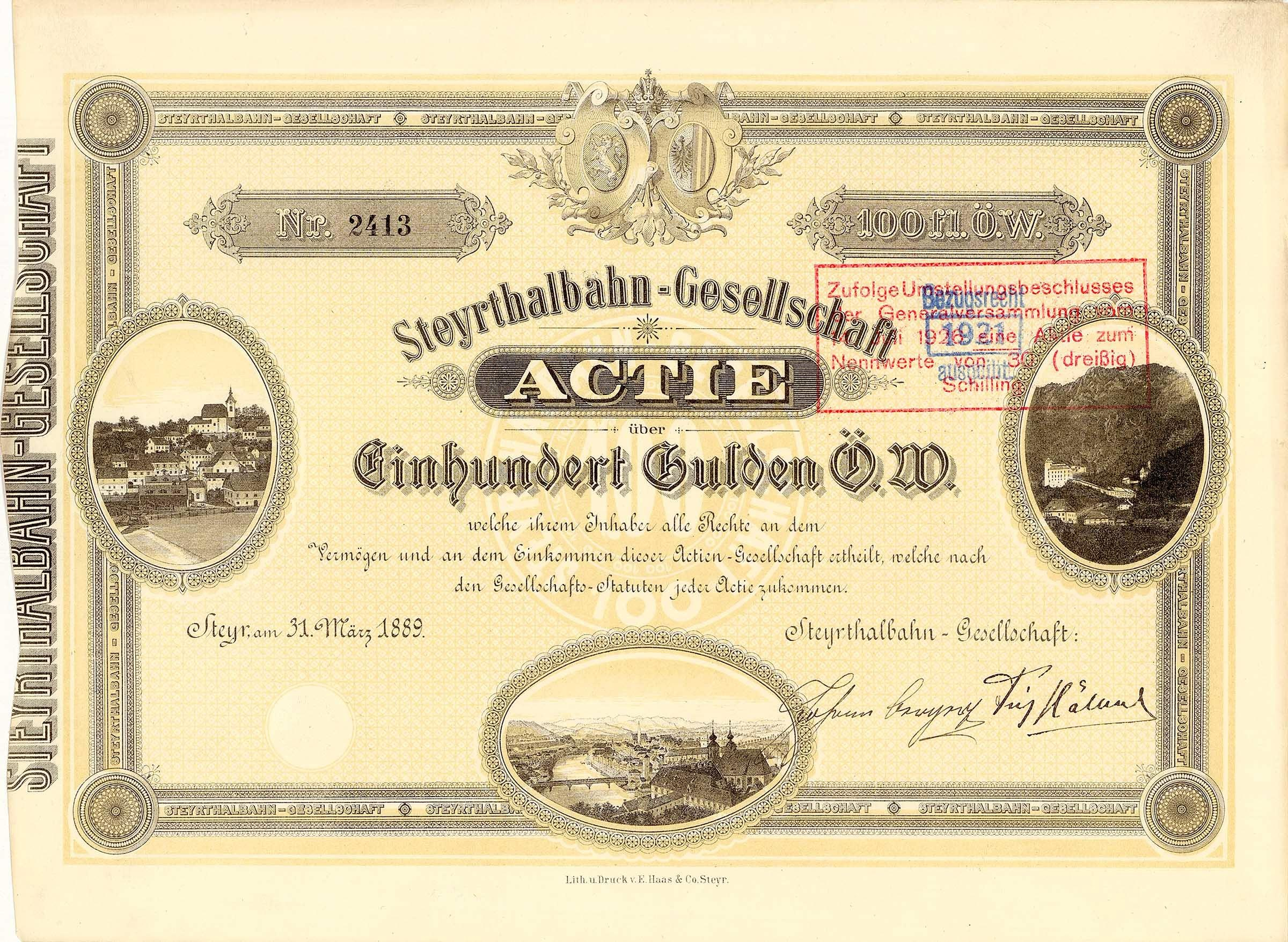
Founder's share of the Steyrthalbahn-Gesellschaft, issued 31 March 1889

The main industries of the Steyr valley were forestry and metalworking. Timber obtained in the area was of a quality useful only for building and firewood or for the charcoal or paper production. Road transport was too expensive, and rail transport was required so the timber could be harvested profitably.

In 1868 the Rudolf Railway (Rudolfsbahn) connected the city of Steyr to the railway network. By 1887 the Krems Valley Railway (Kremstalbahn) reached Bad Hall and Klaus. In 1888 Josef Ritter von Wenusch received a concession for a narrow-gauge railway from Garsten to Grünburg, with a possible extension to Klaus. In the same year the Steyr Valley Railway Company (Steyrtalbahn AG) was created and started building the railway.

1889 saw the opening of the railway to Grünburg, one year later the line was extended to Agonitz. The extension of the line to Klaus was opposed by the Krems Valley Railway Company (Kremstalbahn AG), who were afraid of losing a part their traffic to the Steyr Valley Railway. The Steyrtalbahn therefore concentrated on building the branch line from Pergern to Bad Hall, which was opened 1891.

After the nationalization of the Krems Valley Railway Company in 1902, the extension of the line to Klaus was again taken up. Construction commenced in 1908 and the extension opened in 1909. Thus the Steyr Valley network achieved its largest expansion (55 km).

=== Developments up to 1918 ===
Apart from some early setbacks traffic on the Steyr Valley Railway developed positively. There was an operating surplus and even a modest dividend could always be paid. Growth in the railway was financed by capital increases. Large shareholders in the company included the Steyr armaments company, the Steyr savings bank. and finally also the State of Upper Austria and city of Steyr for construction of the section Agonitz to Klaus.

In the First World War the line was important in providing transportation for armament makers between Steyr and Letten. A temporary transporter wagon transfer system was provided to Letten from 1916 to 1918.

=== Developments up to 1945 ===
The end of the First World War saw economically difficult times began for the Steyr Valley Railway. Motor buses became a serious competitor, with motorbus lines between Steyr and Bad Hall, and Steyr to Grünburg. Particularly badly hit was the Bad Hall branch, where a connection existed to the Krems Valley Railway, and a majority of the passengers moved to the motorbus. All redevelopment efforts failed and in 1931 the railway was taken over by the Austrian Federal Railways (BBÖ). The branch line to Bad Hall remained unprofitable under the BBÖ, and the section Sierning to Bad Hall was closed in 1933 and dismantled at the beginning of the 'forties.

After the Anschluss and the incorporation of Austria into Germany, the Steyr Valley Railway became part of the German National Railways (Deutsche Reichsbahn or DR). The Steyr Valley Railway Company was dissolved in 1940, the railway lines became the property of the DR and thus after 1945 the property of the ÖBB.

=== Development after 1945 ===
The Steyr Valley Railway got through the Second World War without damage, nevertheless rebuilding the track was necessary. This was not done however, as there was war damage in other areas to repair first. The light track prevented the employment of the new narrow gauge diesel locomotives (class 2095) which were introduced from 1958, so that the railway continued to operate exclusively with steam engines.

Further attempts to reduce costs led in 1967 to the closure of the remaining section of the branch line, while in 1968 road buses replaced passenger trains on the section between Klaus and Molln.

On 14 March 1980 a rock slide blocked the line between Leonstein and Haunoldmühle. The next day the line was cleared and services started up again. 14 days later however a commission came to the conclusion that trains could not work the route reliability. As a result, the section Grünburg to Molln was closed. Two years later the remaining line to Grünburg was closed.

== Locomotives ==
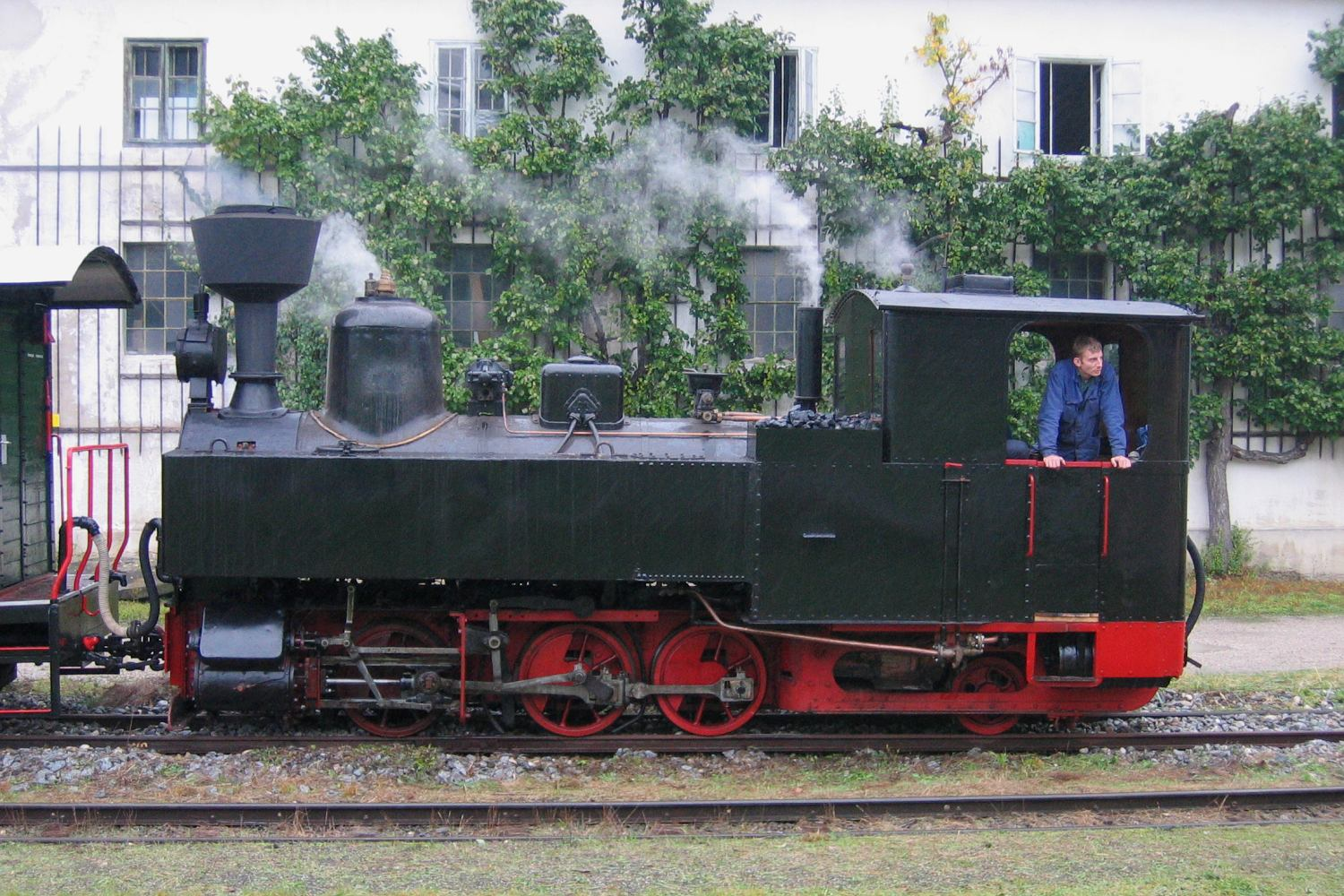
Former ÖBB 298.52 at Sommerhubermühle halt on the Steyr Valley Railway. This particular engine represents the original appearance of the Austrian U-class with Kobel-chimney.

For the opening of the line Krauss built three saturated steam 0-6-2T locomotives. Three further locomotives were built in 1914. The locomotives are regarded as the precursors of the famous U class.

== Steyrtalbahn after the shutdown ==
The Austrian Society for Railway History (ÖGEG) took over the line from Steyr to Grünburg and have operated it since 1985 as museum railway with steam locomotives. Museum operations are on Saturdays and Sundays from the beginning of June to the end of September with special trains at any time.

All other remaining railway tracks were dismantled, with much of the route converted to a bicycle path.
