= Ried im Traunkreis =

- Municipality
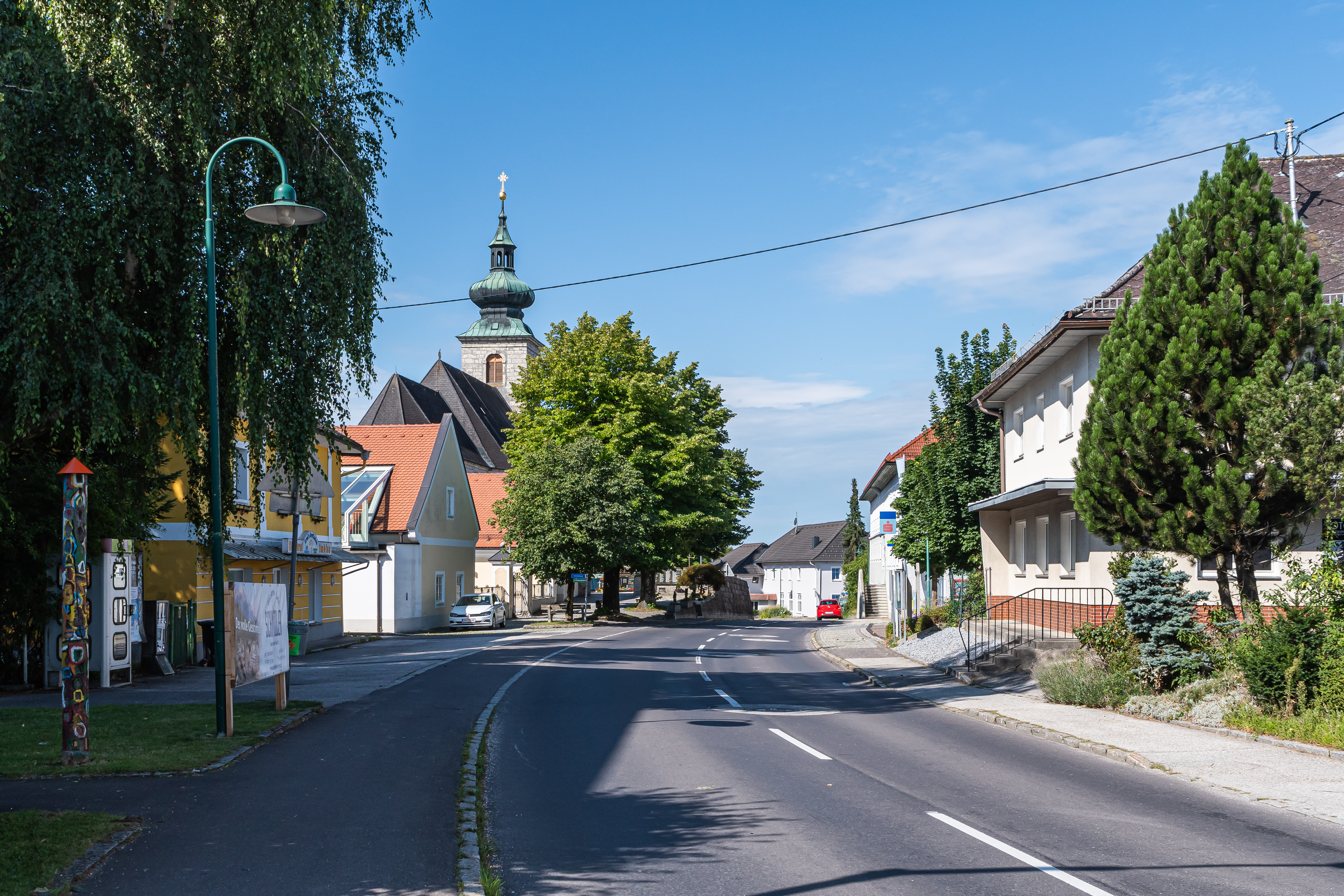

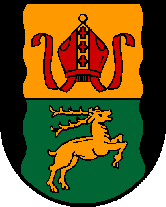
- Coat of arms

- Location within Austria
- Coordinates: 48°0′0″N 14°0′0″E
- Country: Austria
- State: Upper Austria
- District: Kirchdorf an der Krems

Government
  - Mayor: Stefan Schöfberger (SPÖ)

Area
  - Total: 31.14 km^{2} (12.02 sq mi)
- Elevation: 469 m (1,539 ft)

Population (2018-01-01)
  - Total: 2,739
  - Density: 87.96/km^{2} (227.8/sq mi)
- Time zone: UTC+1 (CET)
  - Summer (DST): UTC+2 (CEST)
- Postal code: 4551
- Area code: 07588
- Vehicle registration: KI
- Website: www.ried-traunkreis.at

Ried im Traunkreis is a municipality in the district of Kirchdorf an der Krems in the Austrian state of Upper Austria.

== Population ==
Historical population
Year	Pop.	±%
1870	1,945	—
1900	1,834	−5.7%
1920	2,010	+9.6%
1934	2,120	+5.5%
1961	2,019	−4.8%
1971	1,973	−2.3%
1981	2,106	+6.7%
1991	2,262	+7.4%
2001	2,418	+6.9%
2012	2,647	+9.5%
