= Steinbach am Ziehberg =

- Municipality
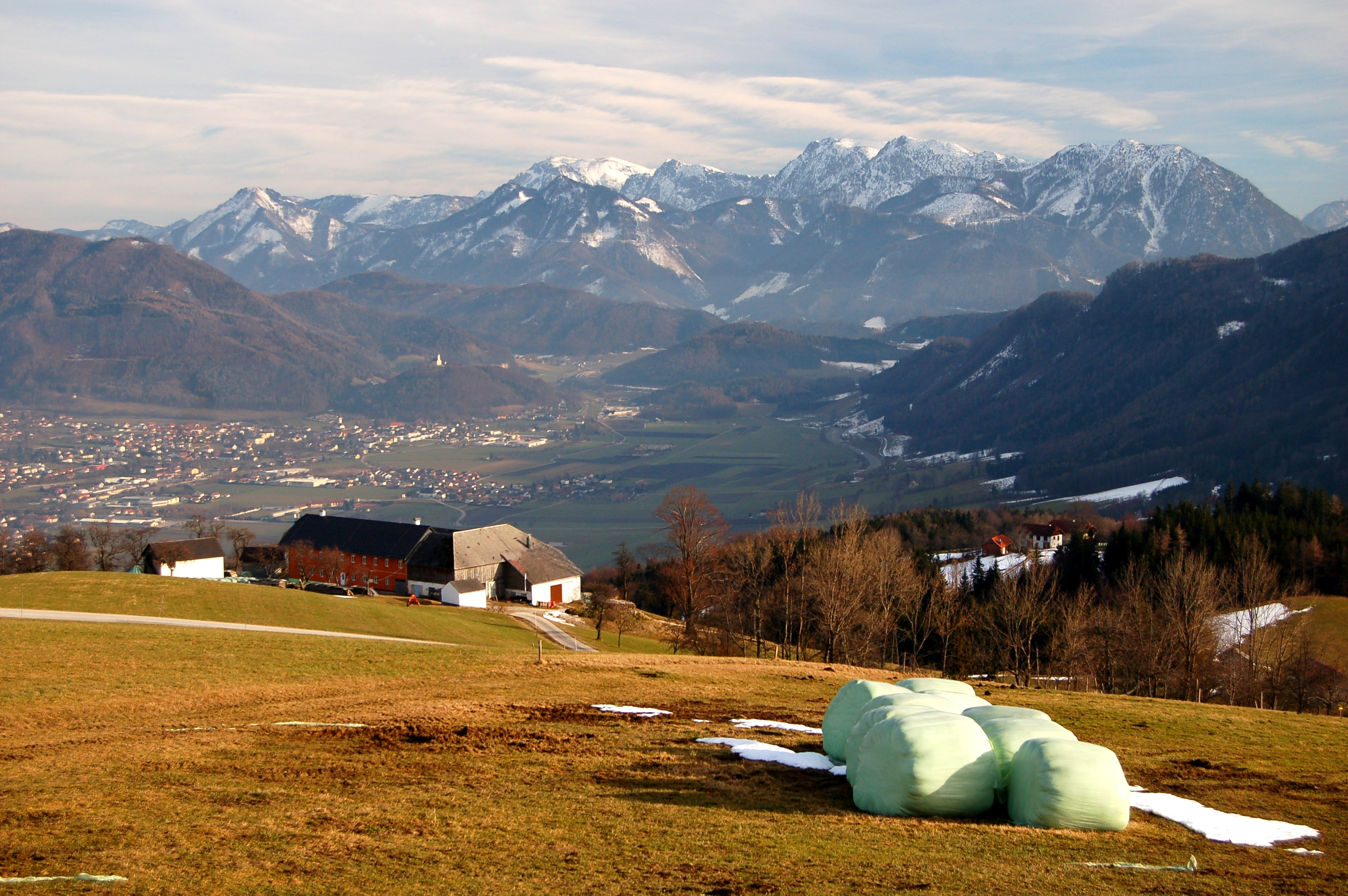

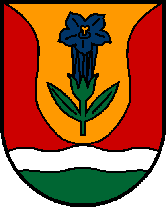
- Coat of arms

- Location within Austria
- Coordinates: 47°53′32″N 14°02′00″E
- Country: Austria
- State: Upper Austria
- District: Kirchdorf an der Krems

Government
  - Mayor: Bettina Lancaster (SPÖ)

Area
  - Total: 34.78 km^{2} (13.43 sq mi)
- Elevation: 547 m (1,795 ft)

Population (2018-01-01)
  - Total: 828
  - Density: 23.8/km^{2} (61.7/sq mi)
- Time zone: UTC+1 (CET)
  - Summer (DST): UTC+2 (CEST)
- Postal code: 4562
- Area code: 07582
- Vehicle registration: KI
- Website: www.steinbach-ziehberg.at

Steinbach am Ziehberg is a municipality in the district of Kirchdorf an der Krems in the Austrian state of Upper Austria.

== Geography ==
Steinbach lies in the Traunviertel. About 65 percent of the municipality is forest, and 27 percent is farmland.

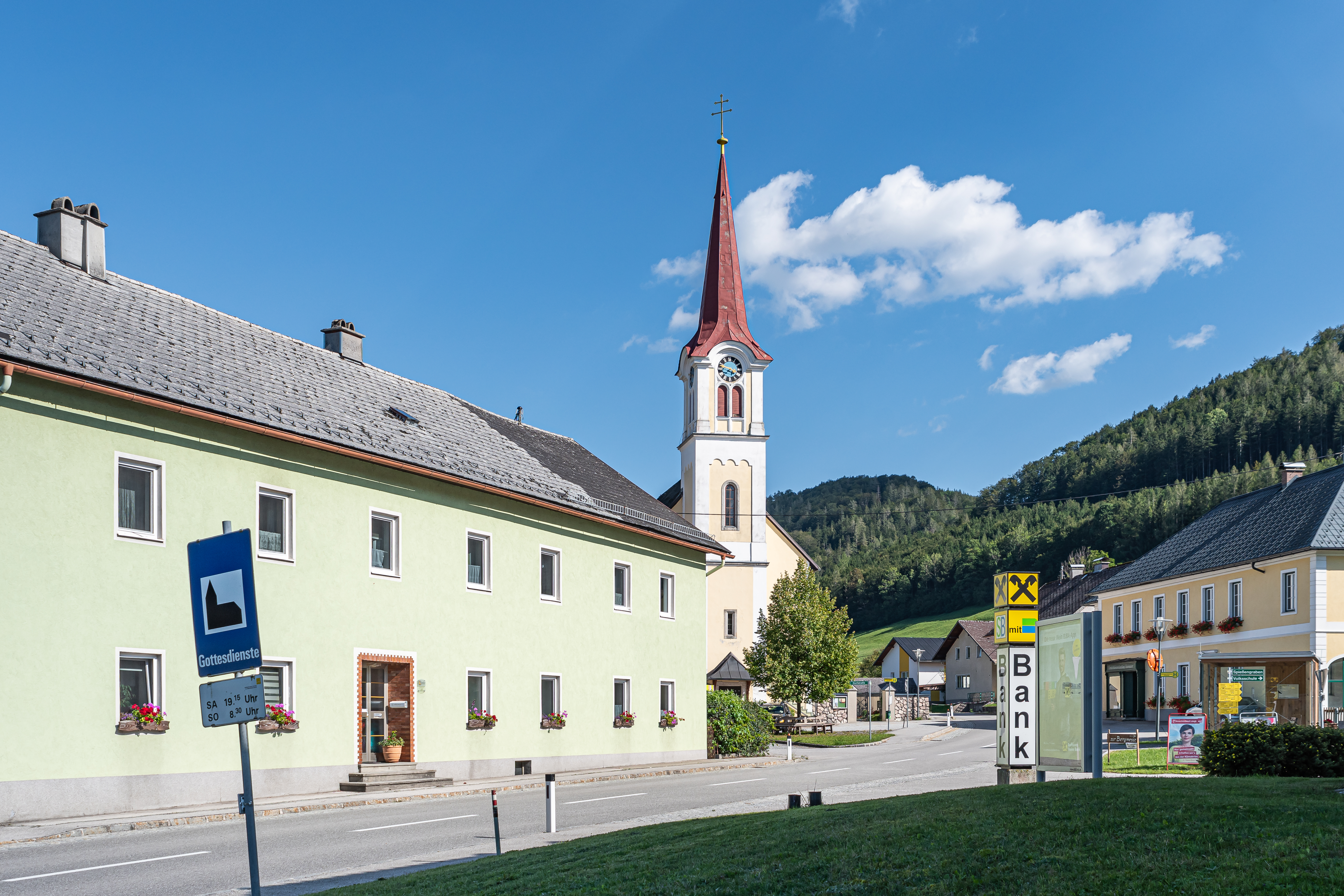
Village at state road 533

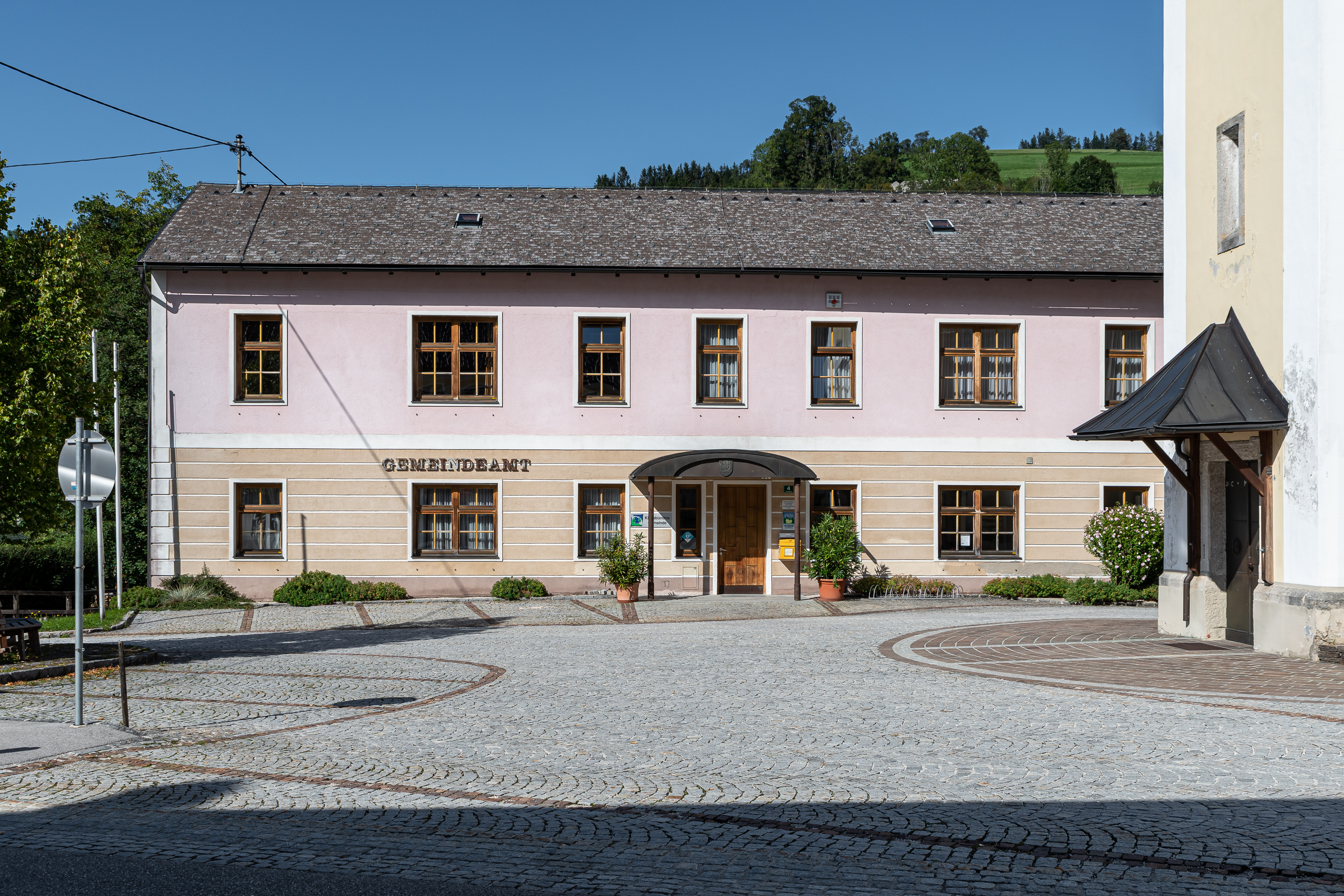
Town hall

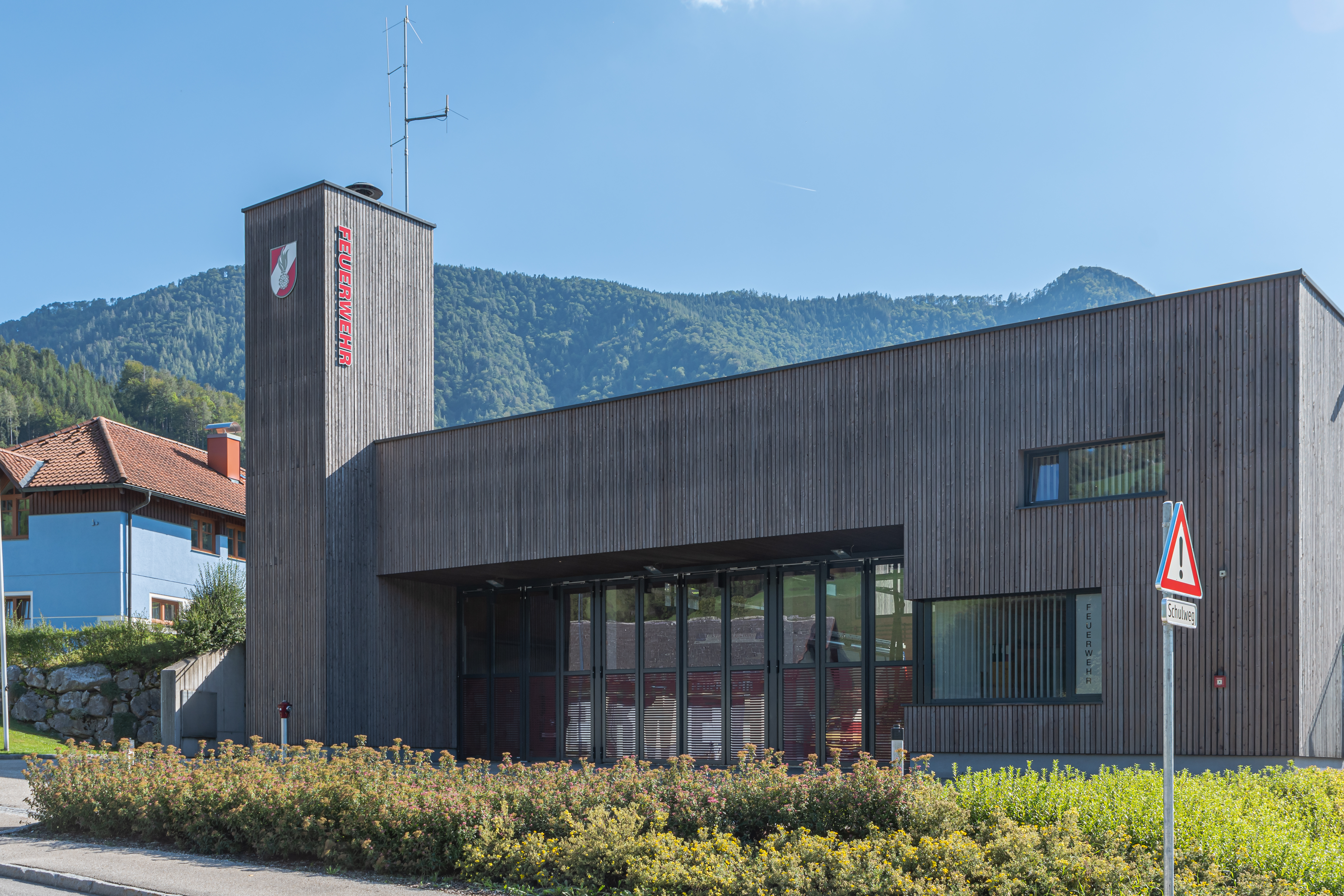
Fire station

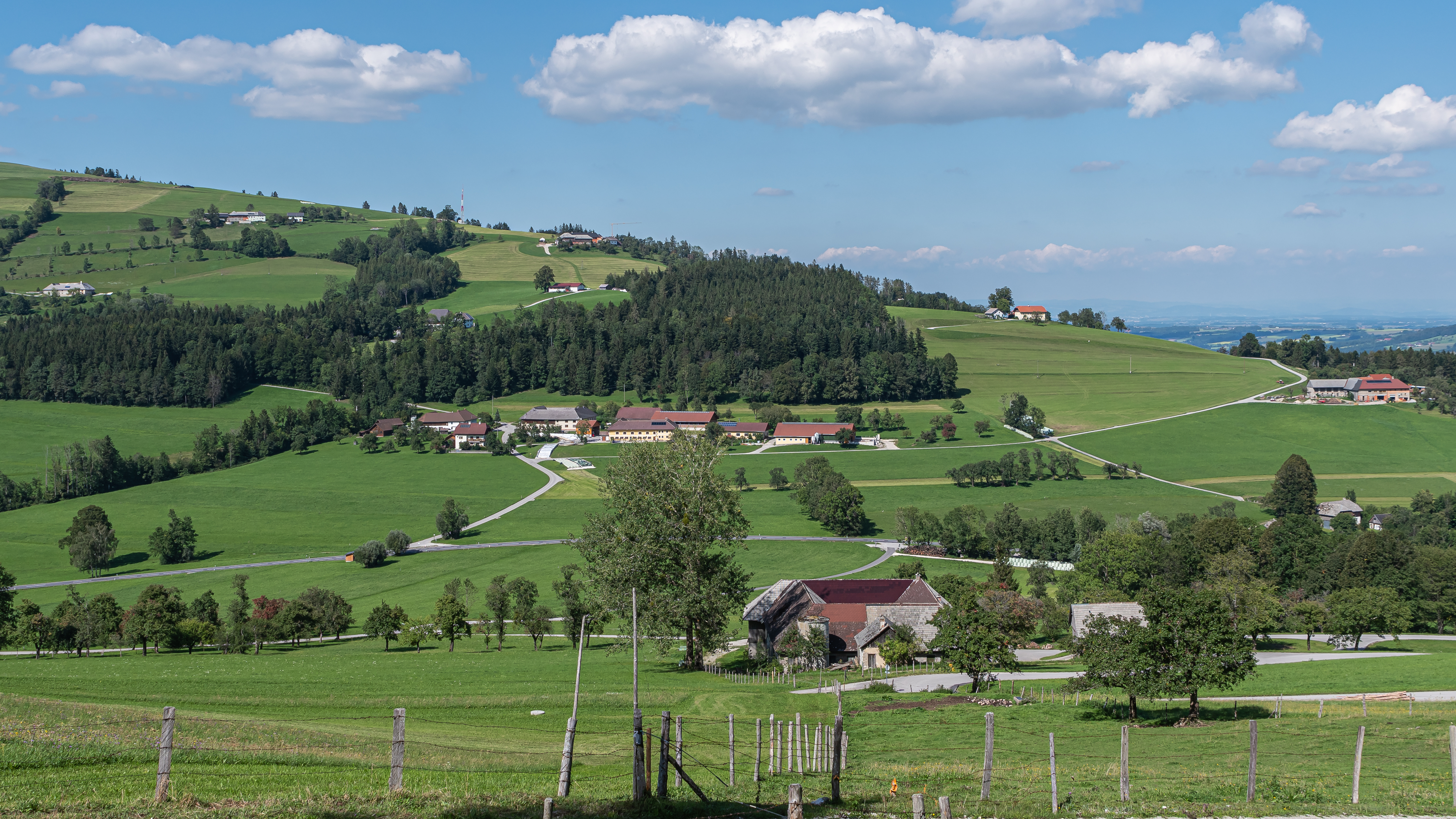
Village at Ziehberghöhe

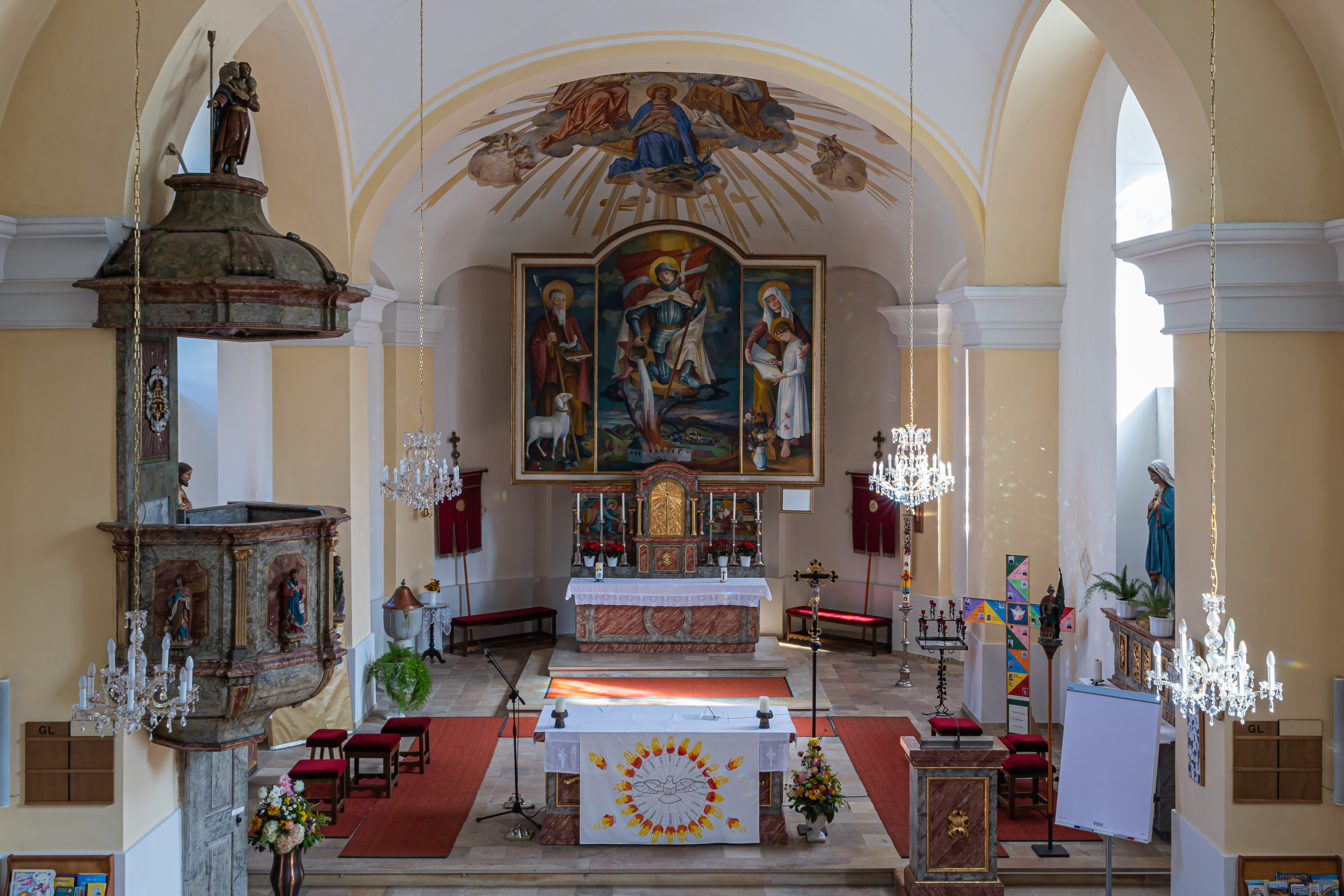
Cath. parish church Saint Florian

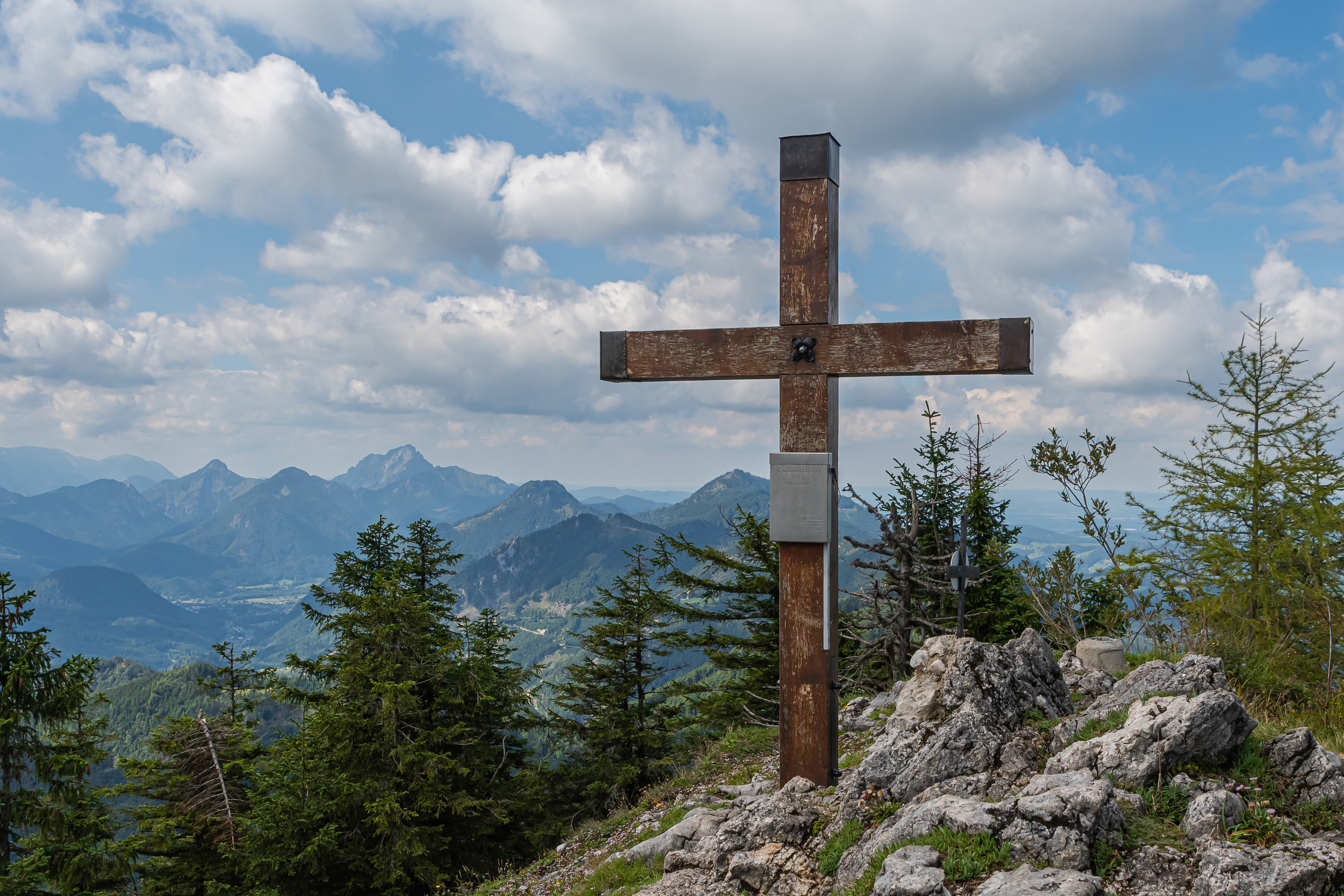
Summit of Pfannstein
