= Edlbach =

- Municipality
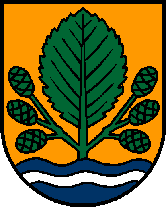
- Coat of arms

- Location within Austria
- Coordinates: 47°42′45″N 14°22′00″E
- Country: Austria
- State: Upper Austria
- District: Kirchdorf an der Krems

Government
  - Mayor: Johann Feßl (ÖVP)

Area
  - Total: 8.35 km^{2} (3.22 sq mi)
- Elevation: 770 m (2,530 ft)

Population (2018-01-01)
  - Total: 670
  - Density: 80/km^{2} (210/sq mi)
- Time zone: UTC+1 (CET)
  - Summer (DST): UTC+2 (CEST)
- Postal code: 4580
- Area code: 07562
- Vehicle registration: KI

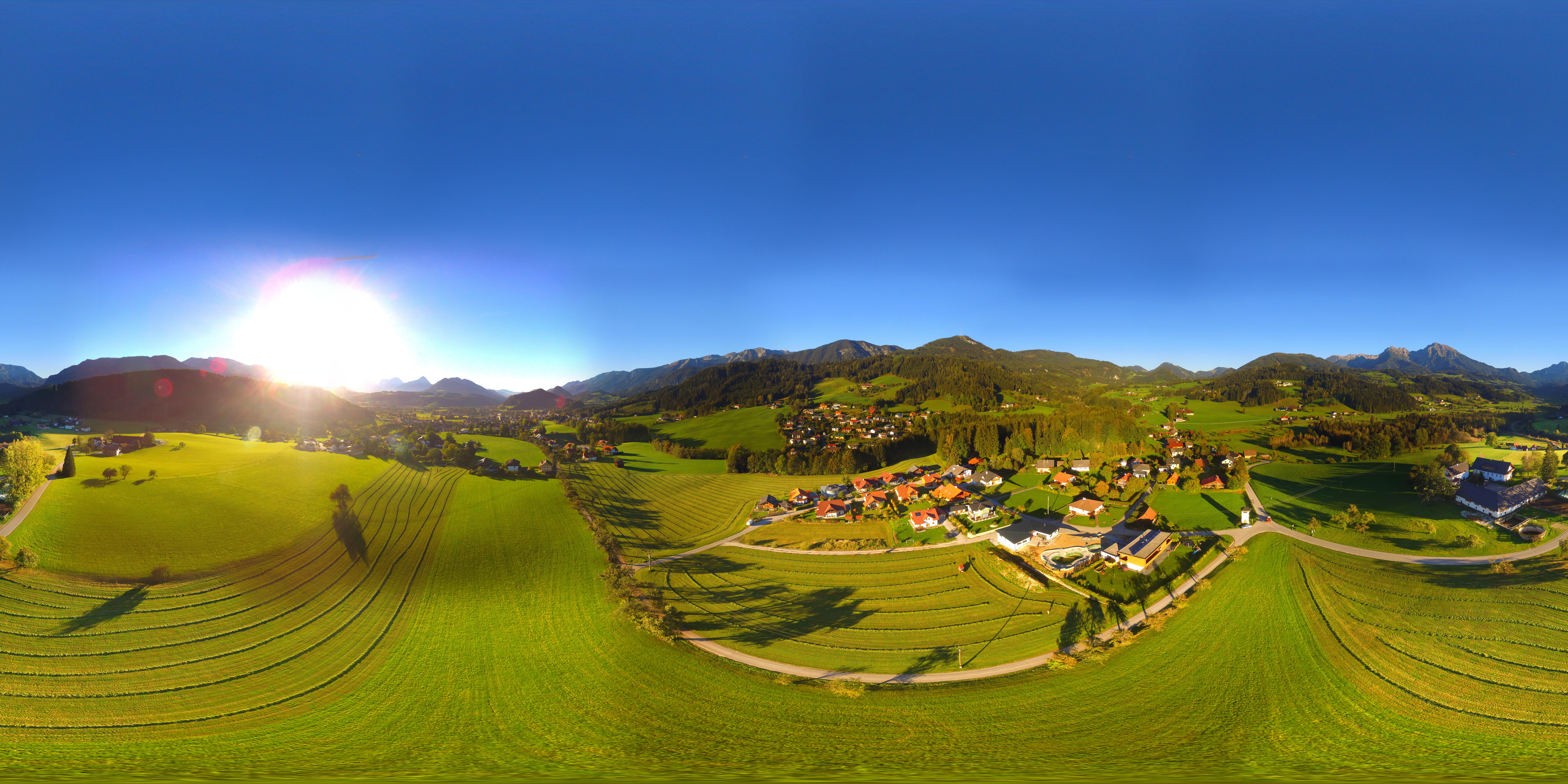
360° airborne panorama, shot over settlement Dörfl (view as a 360° interactive panorama)

Edlbach is a municipality in the Kirchdorf an der Krems district in the Austrian state of Upper Austria.

== Geography ==
Edlbach lies in the Traunviertel. About 24 percent of the municipality is forest, and 65 percent is farmland.
