= Spital am Pyhrn =

- Municipality
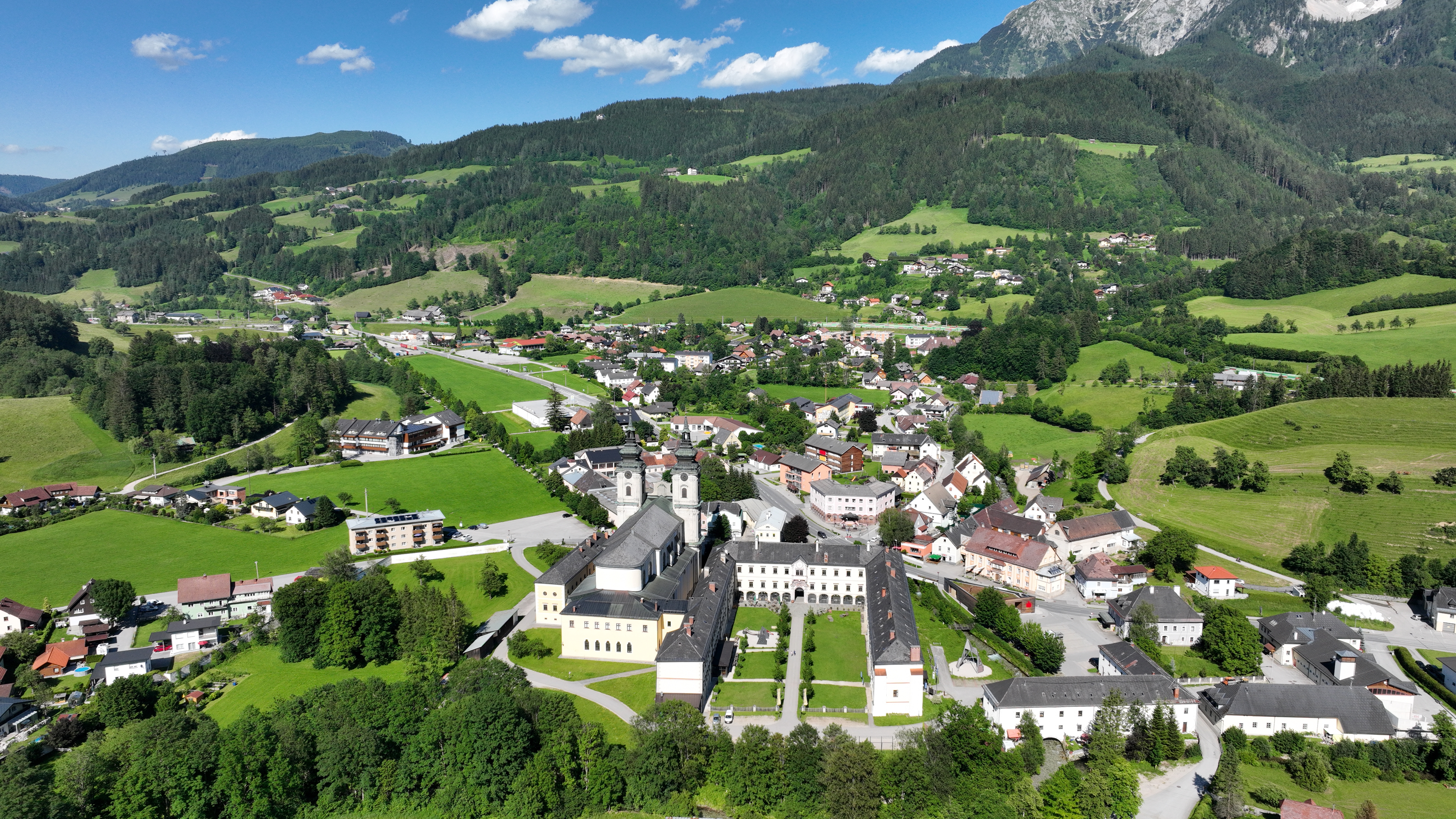
- West view of Spital am Pyhrn

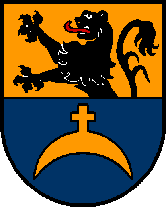
- Coat of arms

- Location within Austria
- Coordinates: 47°39′55″N 14°20′27″E
- Country: Austria
- State: Upper Austria
- District: Kirchdorf an der Krems

Government
  - Mayor: Aegidius Exenberger (SPÖ)

Area
  - Total: 108.89 km^{2} (42.04 sq mi)
- Elevation: 640 m (2,100 ft)

Population (2018-01-01)
  - Total: 2,238
  - Density: 20.55/km^{2} (53.23/sq mi)
- Time zone: UTC+1 (CET)
  - Summer (DST): UTC+2 (CEST)
- Postal code: 4582
- Area code: 07563
- Vehicle registration: KI
- Website: www.spital-pyhrn.at

Spital am Pyhrn is a municipality in the district of Kirchdorf an der Krems in the Austrian state of Upper Austria.

During the Nazi era, an ″Ausländerkinder-Pflegestätte″ was located in Spital, the first such birthing centre in the whole German Reich, where deaths also occurred due to undersupply and neglect.

== Geography ==
Spital am Pyhrn lies 640 metres (2,100 ft) above sea level in the Traunviertel. It stretches 16 kilometres (9.9 mi) from north to south and 12.3 kilometres (7.6 mi) from west to east. The total area of the municipality is 108.89 square kilometres (42.04 sq mi). Of this, 63 percent is forested and 15 percent is used for agriculture.

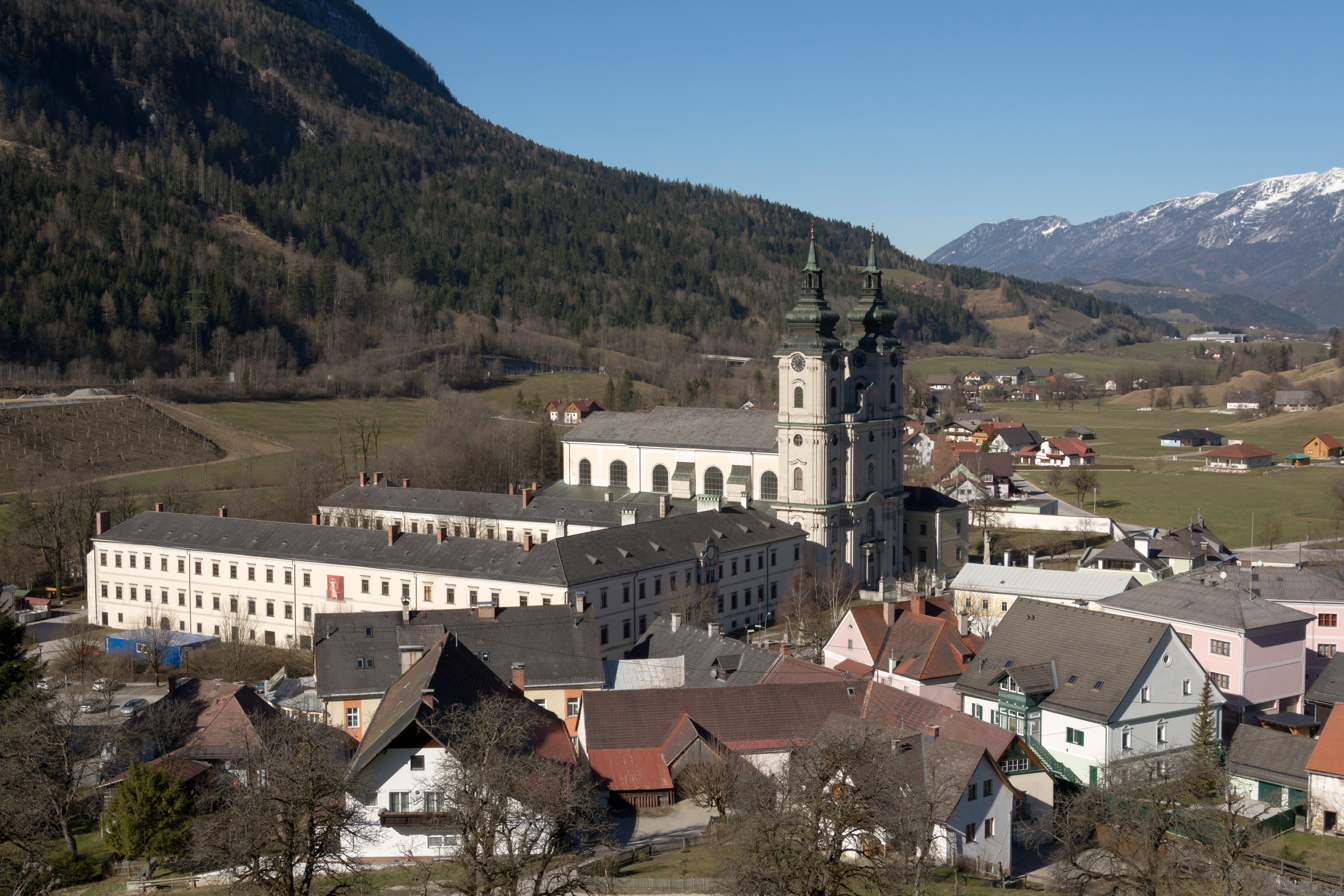
View from Pacherkogel

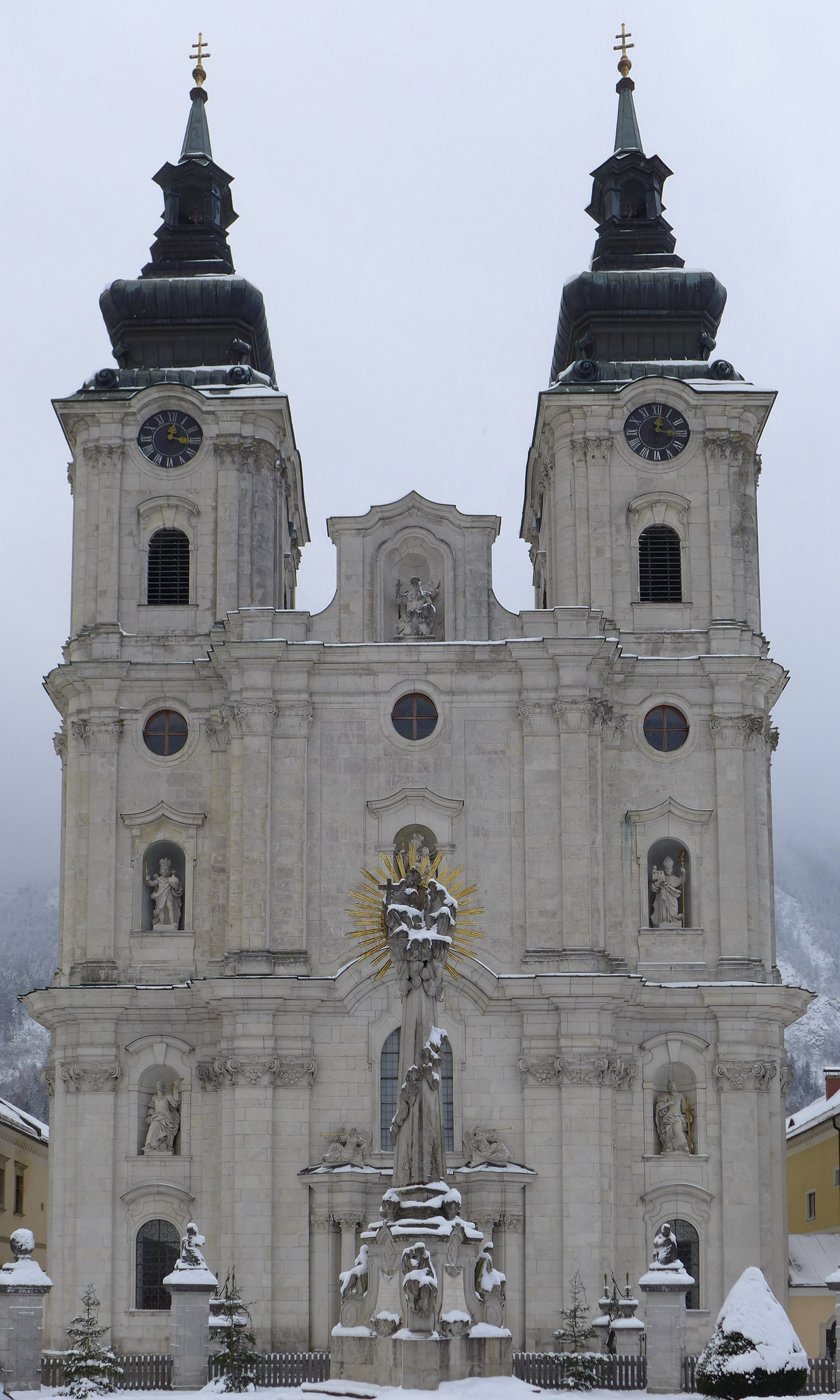
Former monastery in winter

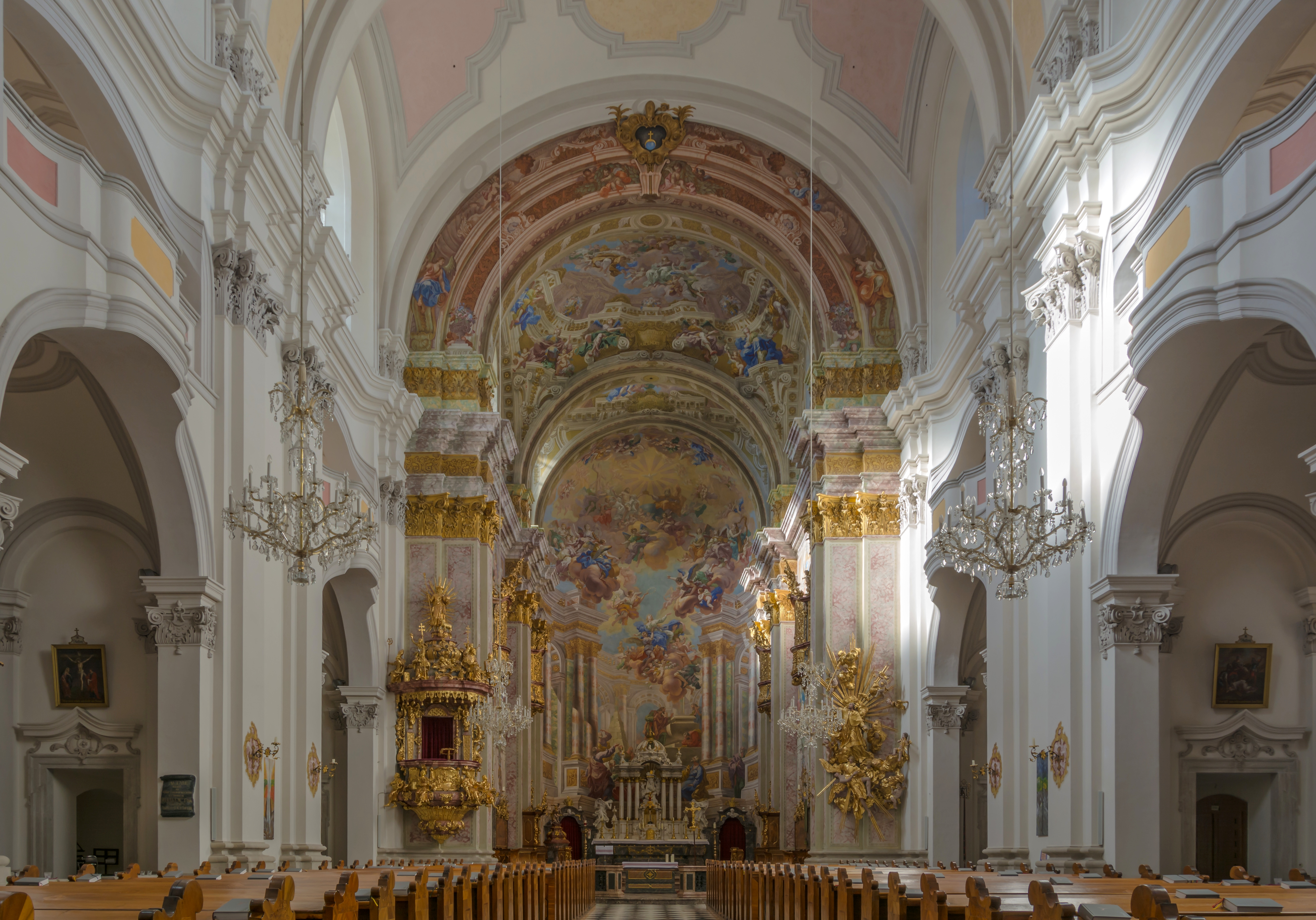
In the parish church

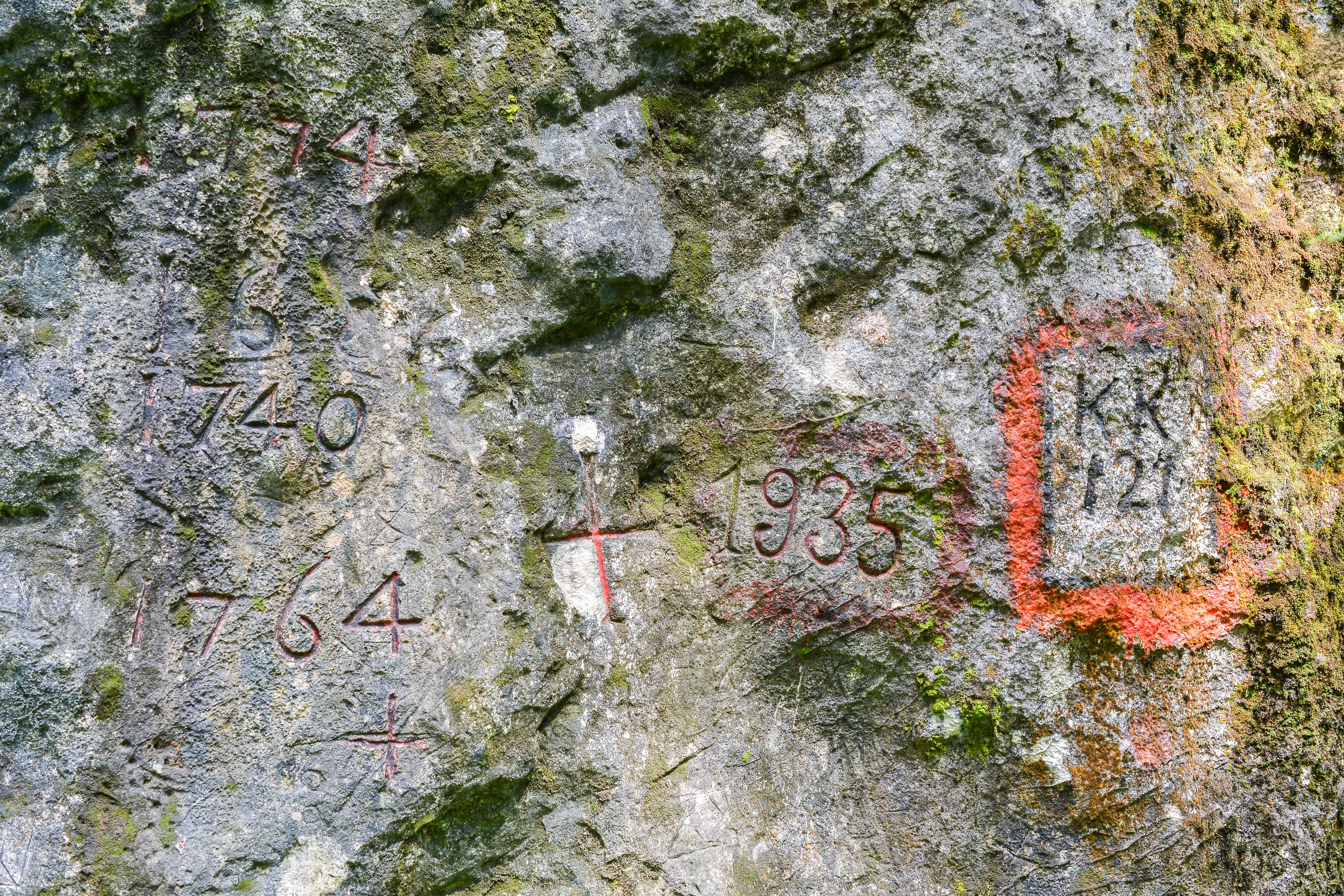
Engravings on rocks

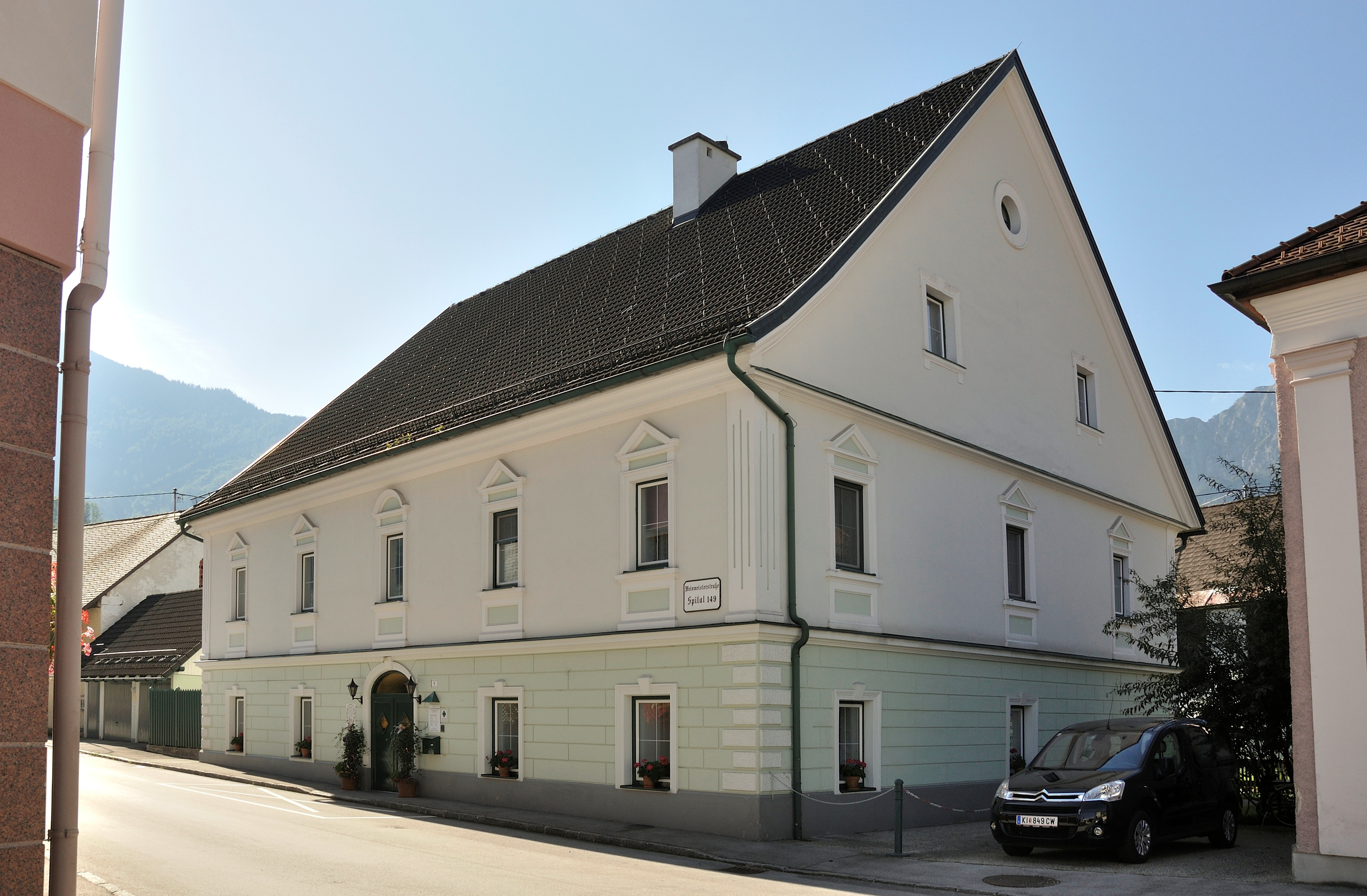
Former mansion of forgery

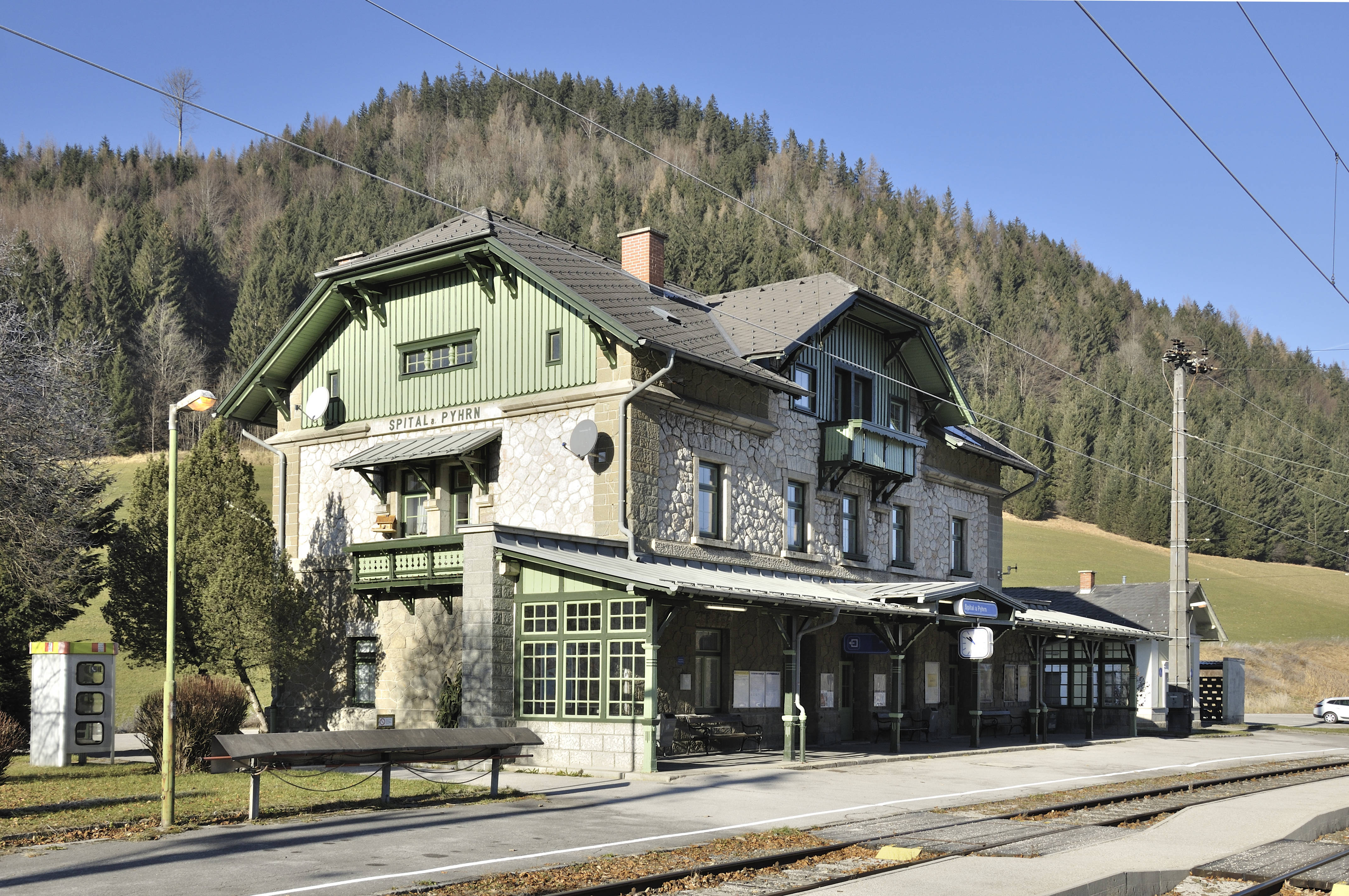
Railway station

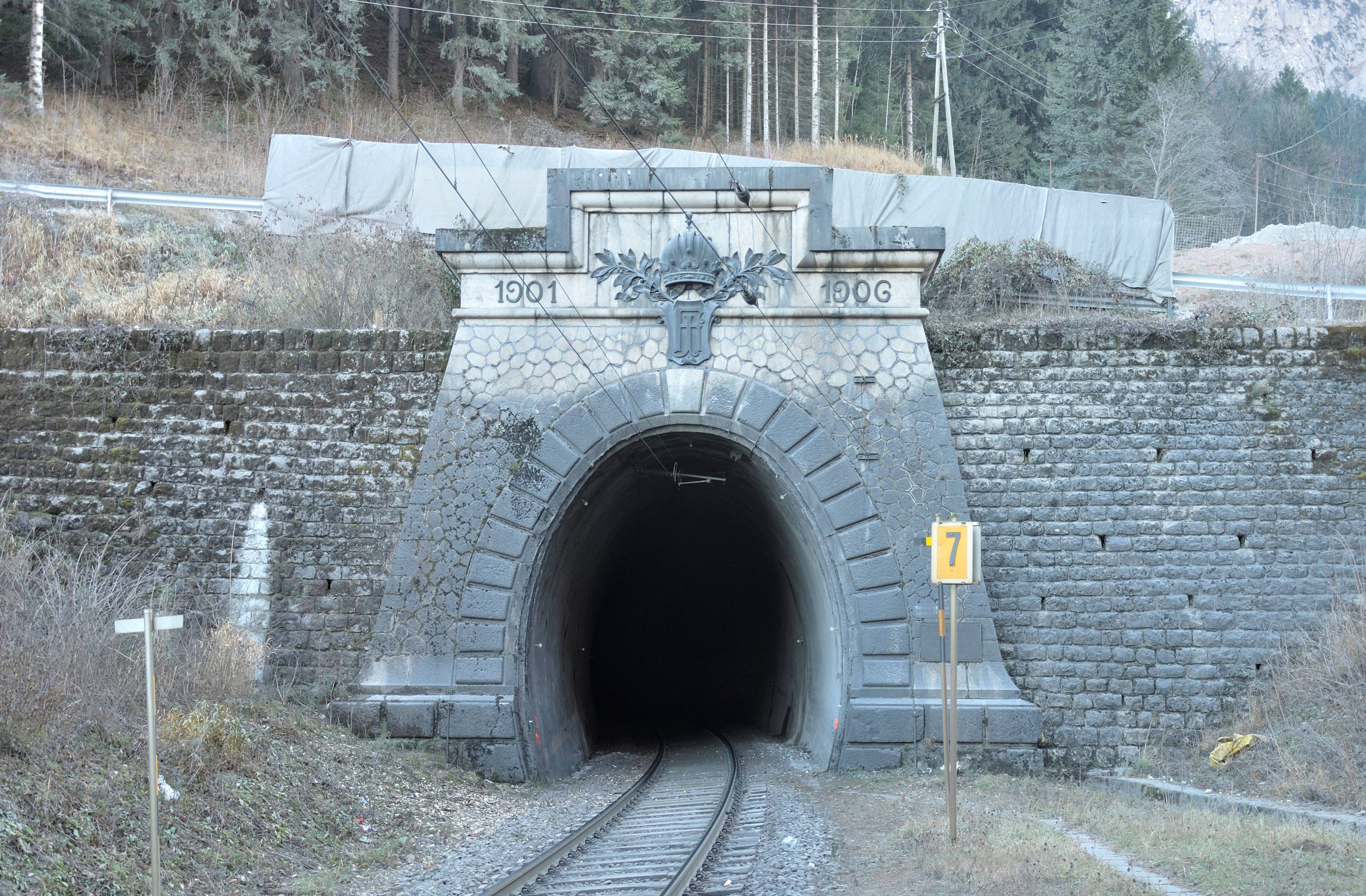
Northportal of railway tunnel Bosruck

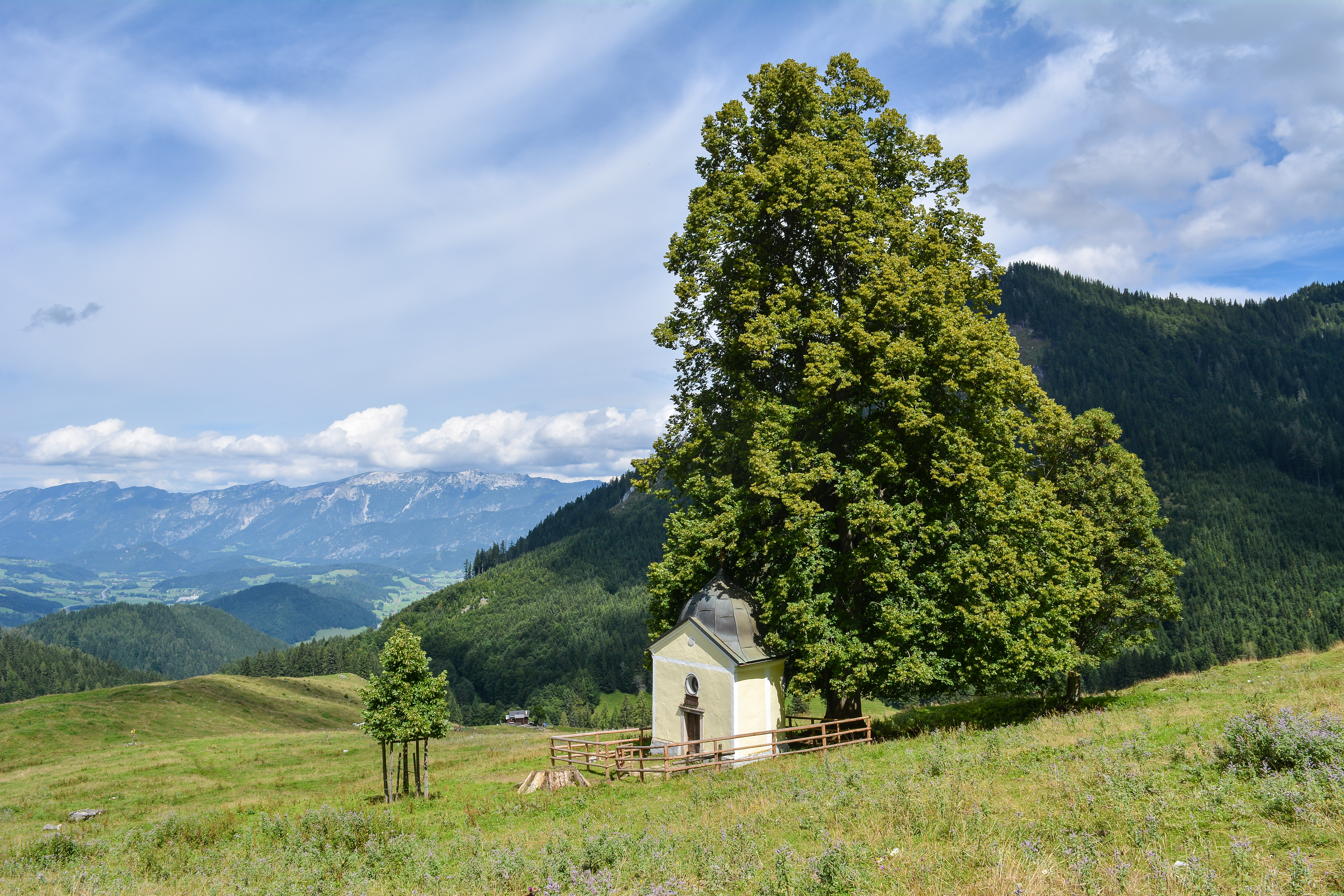
Chapel Ochsenwald

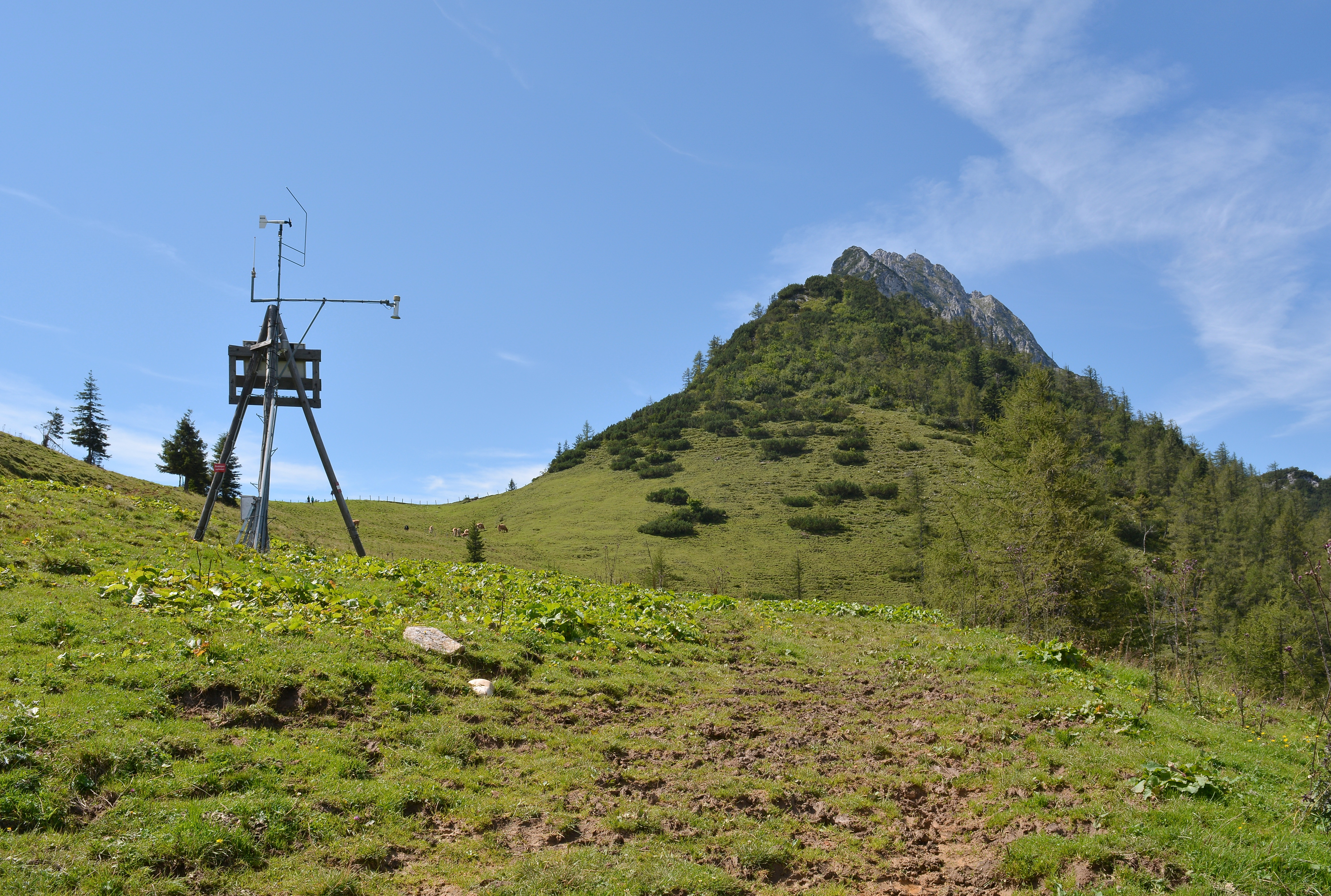
Arlingsattel - mountain pass

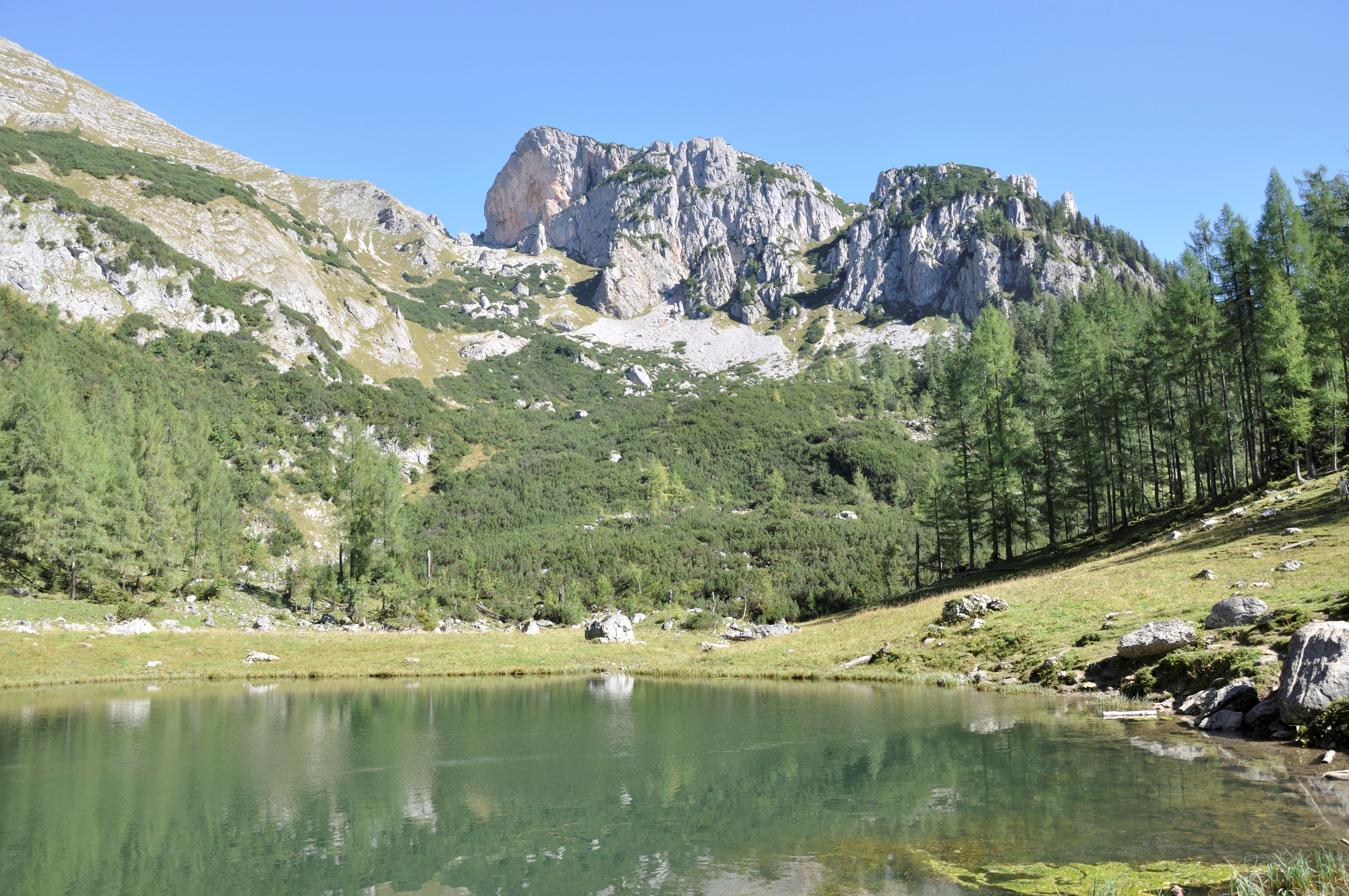
Lake Brunnsteiner

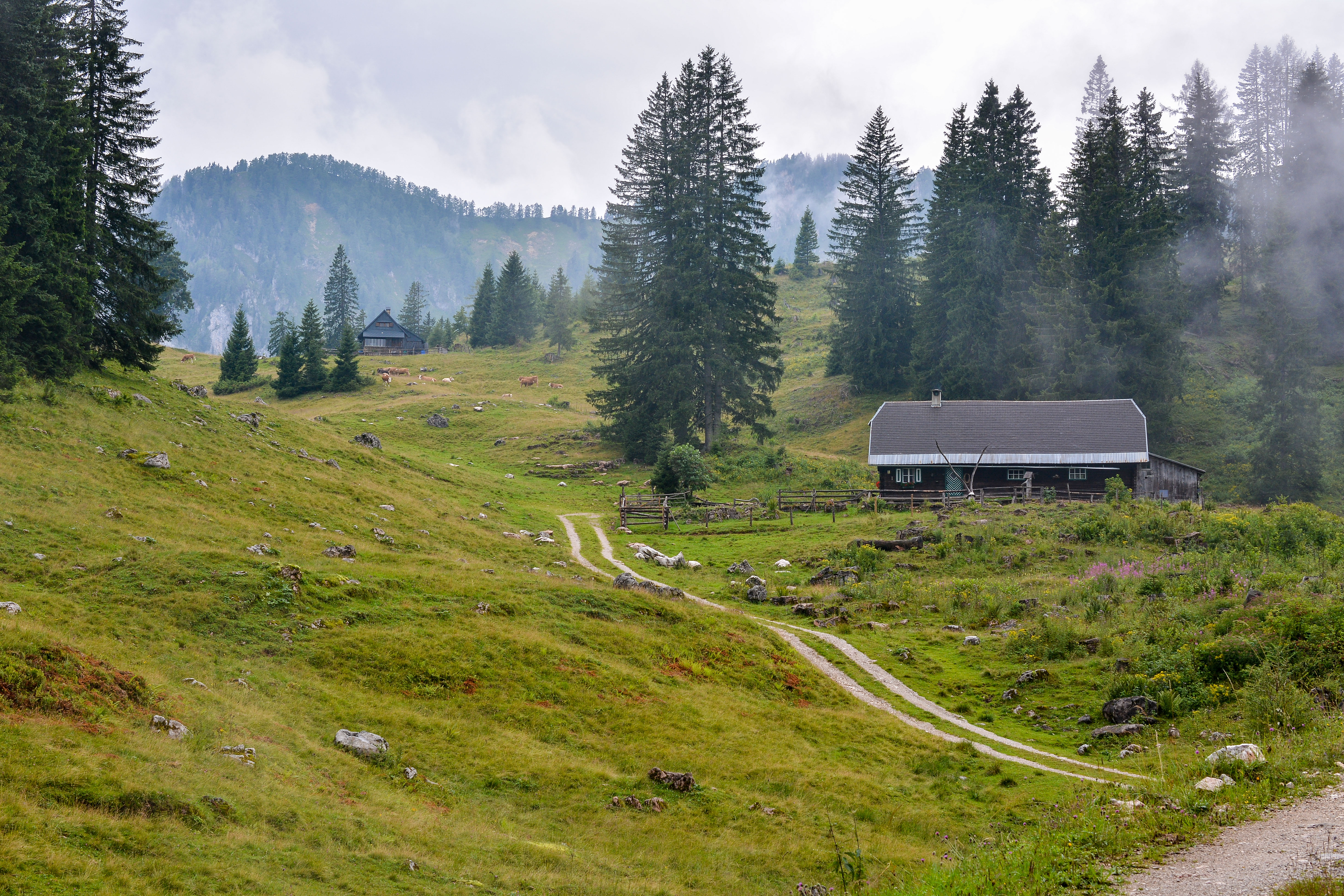
Alpine pasture Schmiedalm

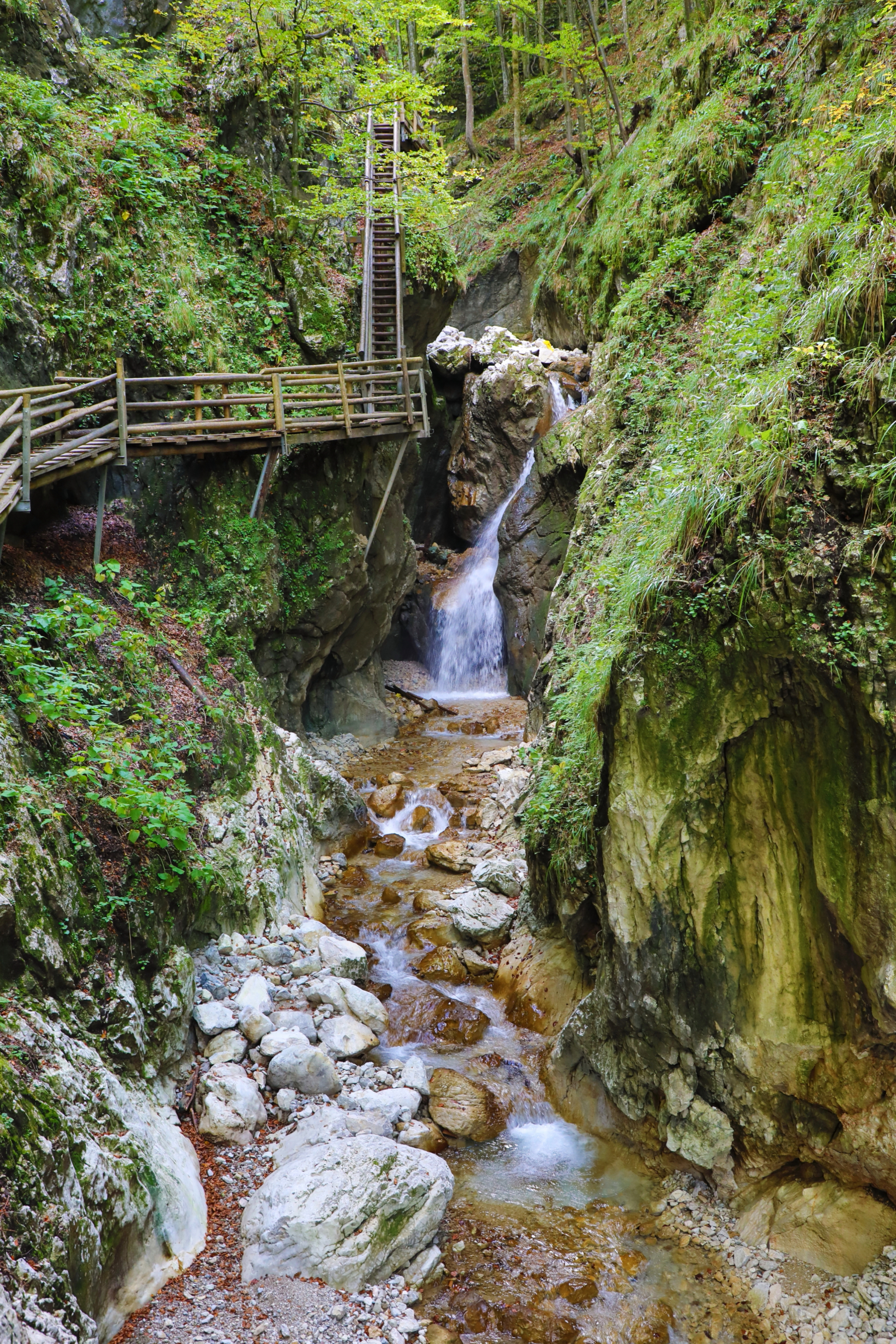
Dr. Vogelgesang Gorge
