= Rosenau am Hengstpaß =

- Municipality
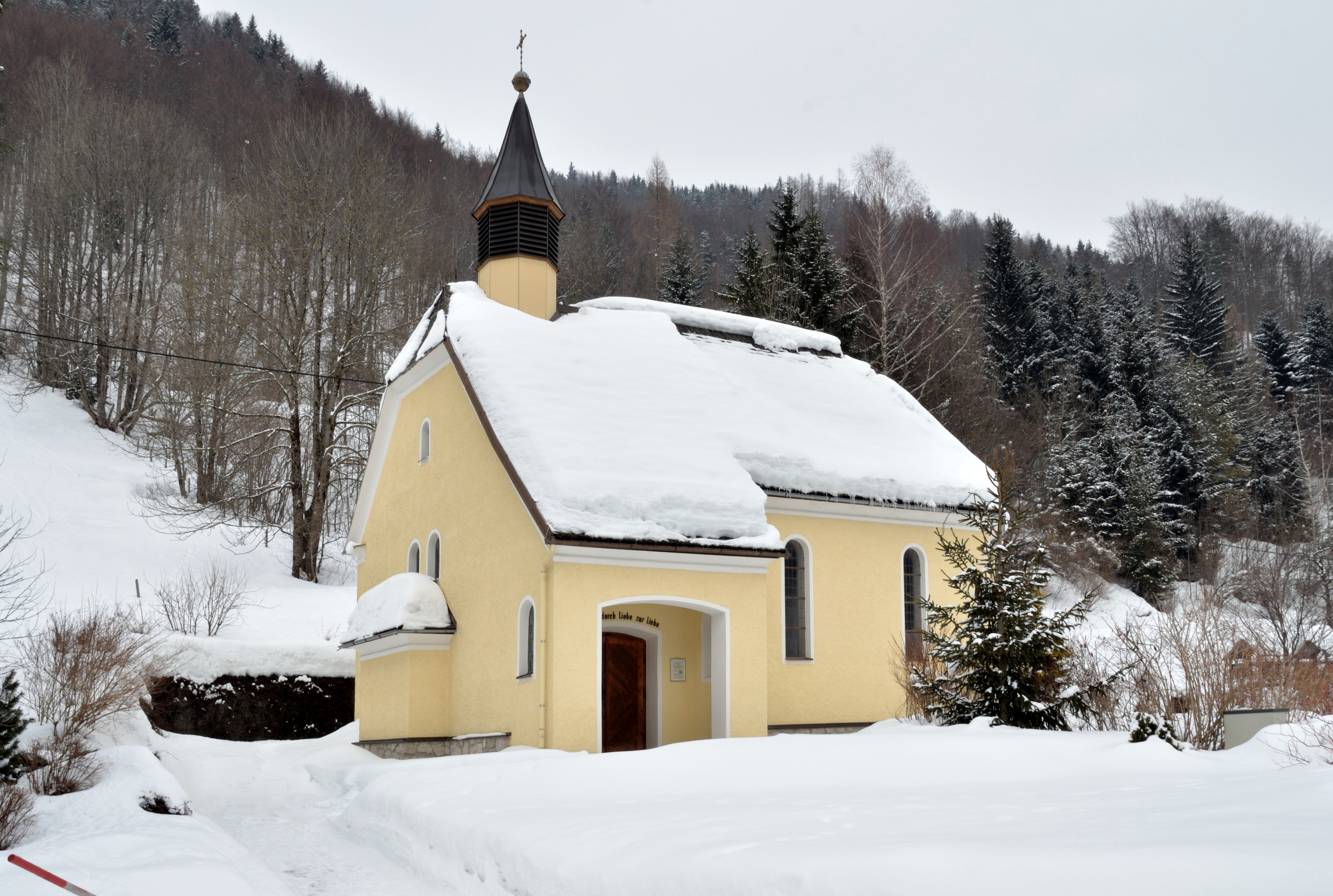

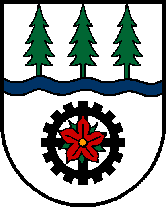
- Coat of arms

- Location within Austria
- Coordinates: 47°42′49″N 14°23′46″E
- Country: Austria
- State: Upper Austria
- District: Kirchdorf an der Krems

Government
  - Mayor: Maria Benedetter (SPÖ)

Area
  - Total: 108.28 km^{2} (41.81 sq mi)
- Elevation: 700 m (2,300 ft)

Population (2018-01-01)
  - Total: 663
  - Density: 6.12/km^{2} (15.9/sq mi)
- Time zone: UTC+1 (CET)
  - Summer (DST): UTC+2 (CEST)
- Postal code: 4581
- Area code: 07566
- Vehicle registration: KI
- Website: www.rosenau.ooe.gv.at

Rosenau am Hengstpaß is a municipality in the district of Kirchdorf an der Krems in the Austrian state of Upper Austria.

== Geography ==
Rosenau lies in the Traunviertel. About 70 percent of the municipality is forest, and 13 percent is farmland.
