= Kirchdorf District =

Coordinates: 47.884°N 14.158°E

Kirchdorf District Bezirk Kirchdorf
- District
- Country: Austria
- State: Upper Austria
- Number of municipalities: 23
- Administrative seat: Kirchdorf an der Krems

Government
  - District Governor: Elisabeth Leitner

Area
  - Total: 1,239.8 km^{2} (478.7 sq mi)

Population (2001)
  - Total: 55,167
  - Density: 44.497/km^{2} (115.25/sq mi)
- Time zone: UTC+01:00 (CET)
  - Summer (DST): UTC+02:00 (CEST)
- Vehicle registration: KI

Bezirk Kirchdorf is a district of the state of Upper Austria in Austria.

== Municipalities ==
Towns (Städte) are indicated in boldface; market towns (Marktgemeinden) in italics; suburbs, hamlets and other subdivisions of a municipality are indicated in small characters.

- Edlbach
- Grünburg
- Hinterstoder
- Inzersdorf im Kremstal
- Kirchdorf an der Krems
- Klaus an der Pyhrnbahn
- Kremsmünster
- Micheldorf in Oberösterreich
- Molln
- Nußbach
- Oberschlierbach
- Pettenbach
- Ried im Traunkreis
- Rosenau am Hengstpaß
- Roßleithen
- Schlierbach
- Spital am Pyhrn
- St. Pankraz
- Steinbach am Ziehberg
- Steinbach an der Steyr
- Vorderstoder
- Wartberg an der Krems
- Windischgarsten
