= Micheldorf in Oberösterreich =

- Municipality
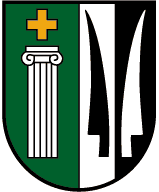
- Coat of arms

- Location within Austria
- Coordinates: 47°52′41″N 14°08′00″E
- Country: Austria
- State: Upper Austria
- District: Kirchdorf an der Krems

Government
  - Mayor: Horst Hufnagl (SPÖ)

Area
  - Total: 50.31 km^{2} (19.42 sq mi)
- Elevation: 465 m (1,526 ft)

Population (2018-01-01)
  - Total: 5,854
  - Density: 116.4/km^{2} (301.4/sq mi)
- Time zone: UTC+1 (CET)
  - Summer (DST): UTC+2 (CEST)
- Postal code: 4563
- Area code: 07582
- Vehicle registration: KI
- Website: www.micheldorf.at

Micheldorf in Oberösterreich is a municipality in the district of Kirchdorf an der Krems in the Austrian state of Upper Austria.

== Population ==
Historical population
Year	Pop.	±%
1869	3,000	—
1880	2,871	−4.3%
1890	2,832	−1.4%
1900	2,864	+1.1%
1910	2,968	+3.6%
1923	2,826	−4.8%
1934	3,070	+8.6%
1939	2,777	−9.5%
1951	3,658	+31.7%
1961	2,767	−24.4%
1971	4,269	+54.3%
1981	4,570	+7.1%
1991	4,870	+6.6%
2001	5,589	+14.8%
2009	5,969	+6.8%

== History ==
The municipality bears the coat of arms of its former lords, the Jörger von Tollet family.
