= Inzersdorf im Kremstal =

- Municipality
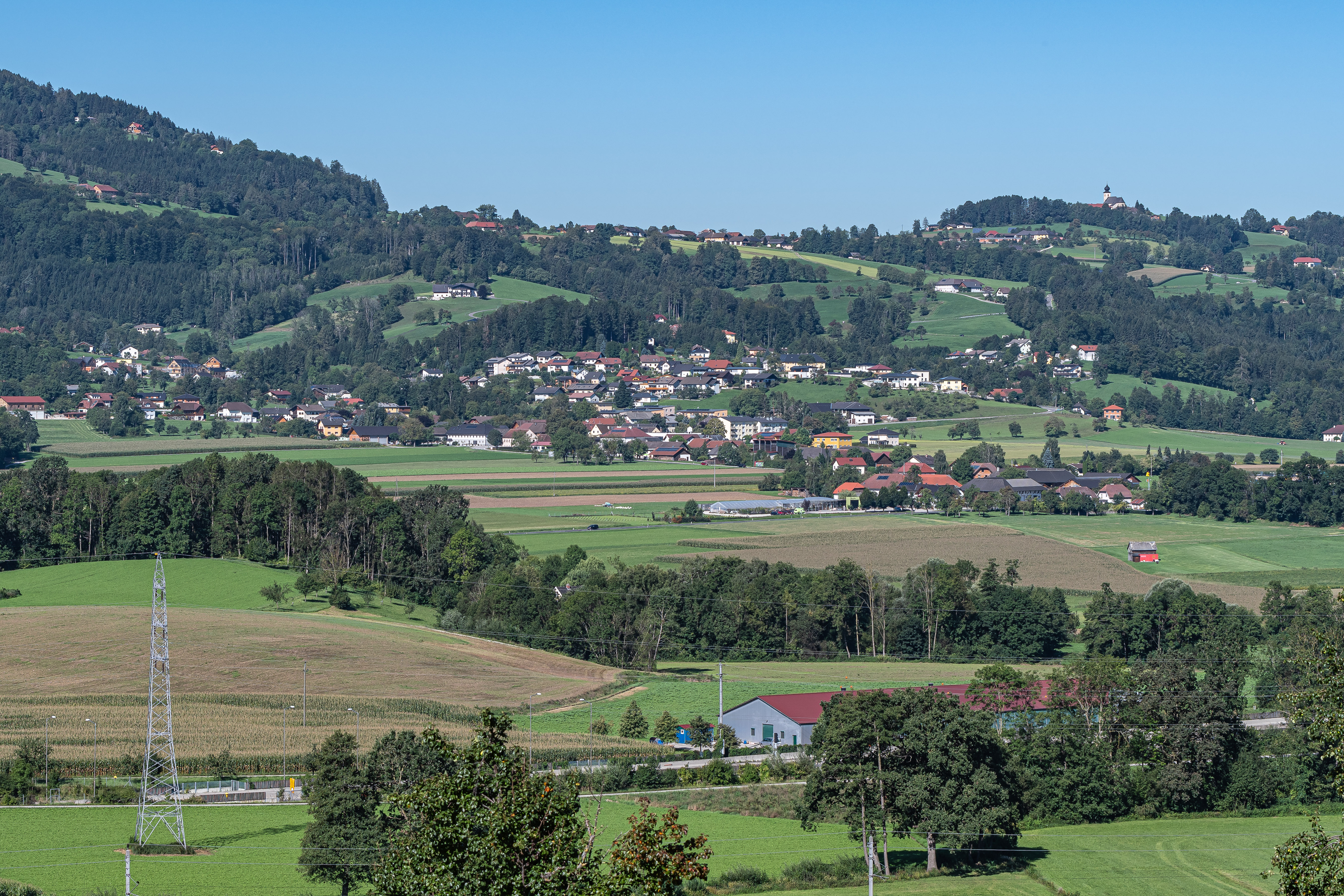

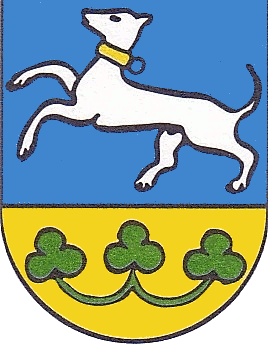
- Coat of arms

- Location within Austria
- Coordinates: 47°55′47″N 14°0′0″E
- Country: Austria
- State: Upper Austria
- District: Kirchdorf an der Krems

Government
  - Mayor: Bernhard Winkler-Ebner (ÖVP)

Area
  - Total: 22.72 km^{2} (8.77 sq mi)
- Elevation: 434 m (1,424 ft)

Population (2018-01-01)
  - Total: 1,880
  - Density: 82.7/km^{2} (214/sq mi)
- Time zone: UTC+1 (CET)
  - Summer (DST): UTC+2 (CEST)
- Postal code: 4560
- Area code: 07582
- Vehicle registration: KI
- Website: www.inzersdorf. ooe.gv.at

Inzersdorf im Kremstal (German pronunciation: [ˈɪnt͡sɐsˌdɔʁf]) is a municipality in the district of Kirchdorf an der Krems in the Austrian state of Upper Austria.

== Geography ==
Inzersdorf lies in the Krems valley in the Traunviertel. About 30 percent of the municipality is forest, and 59 percent is farmland.
