= Oberschlierbach =

- Municipality
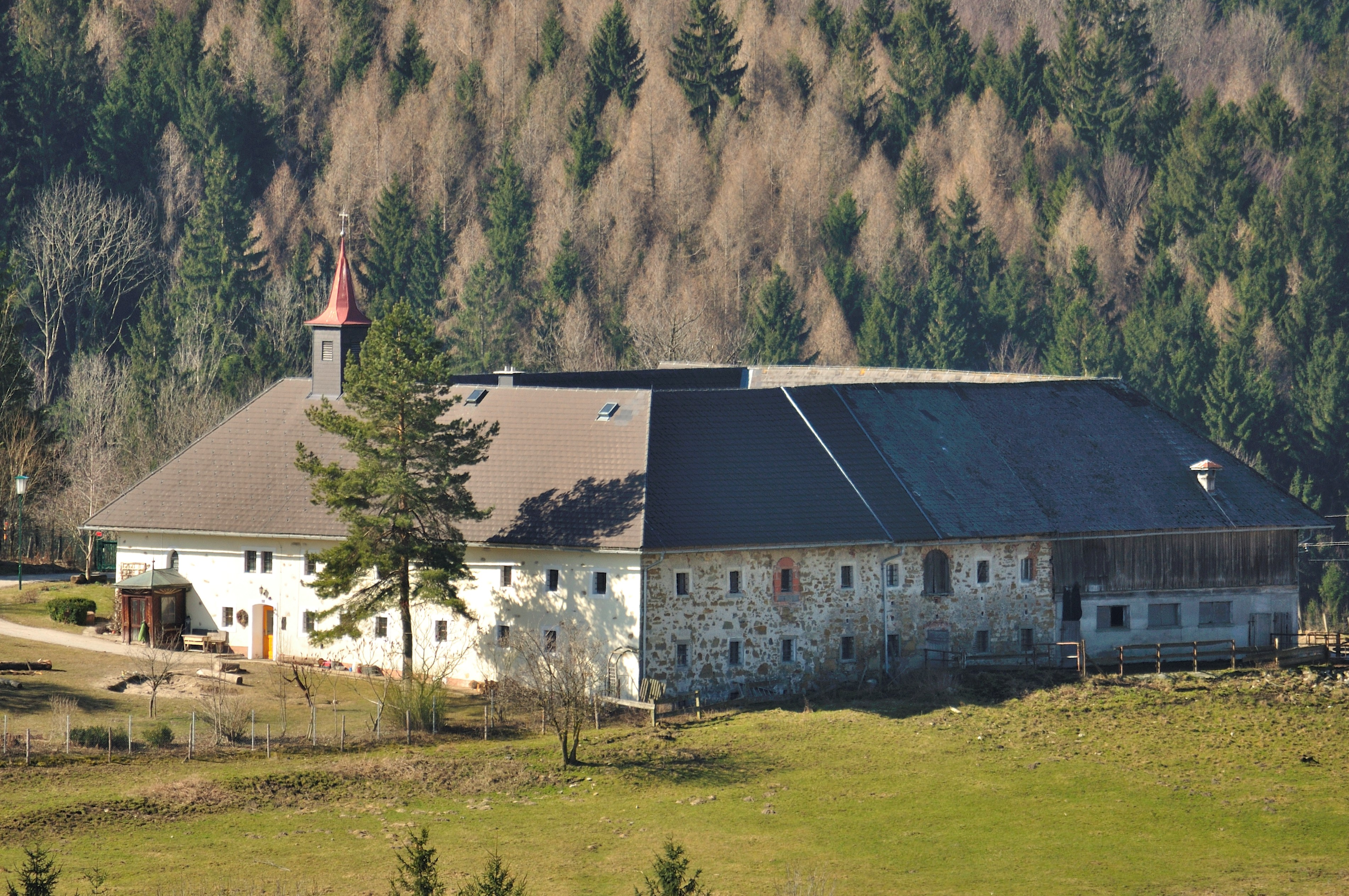
- Farm with chapel

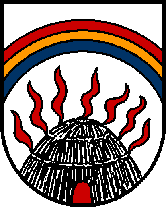
- Coat of arms

- Location within Austria
- Coordinates: 47°55′31″N 14°0′0″E
- Country: Austria
- State: Upper Austria
- District: Kirchdorf an der Krems

Government
  - Mayor: Oskar Grassnigg (SPÖ)

Area
  - Total: 18.27 km^{2} (7.05 sq mi)
- Elevation: 760 m (2,490 ft)

Population (2018-01-01)
  - Total: 484
  - Density: 26.5/km^{2} (68.6/sq mi)
- Time zone: UTC+1 (CET)
  - Summer (DST): UTC+2 (CEST)
- Postal code: 4553
- Area code: 07582
- Vehicle registration: KI

Oberschlierbach is a municipality in the district of Kirchdorf an der Krems in the Austrian state of Upper Austria.

== Geography ==
Oberschlierbach lies in the Traunviertel. About 59 percent of the municipality is forest, and 36 percent is farmland.
