= Nußbach, Austria =

Nußbach
- Municipality
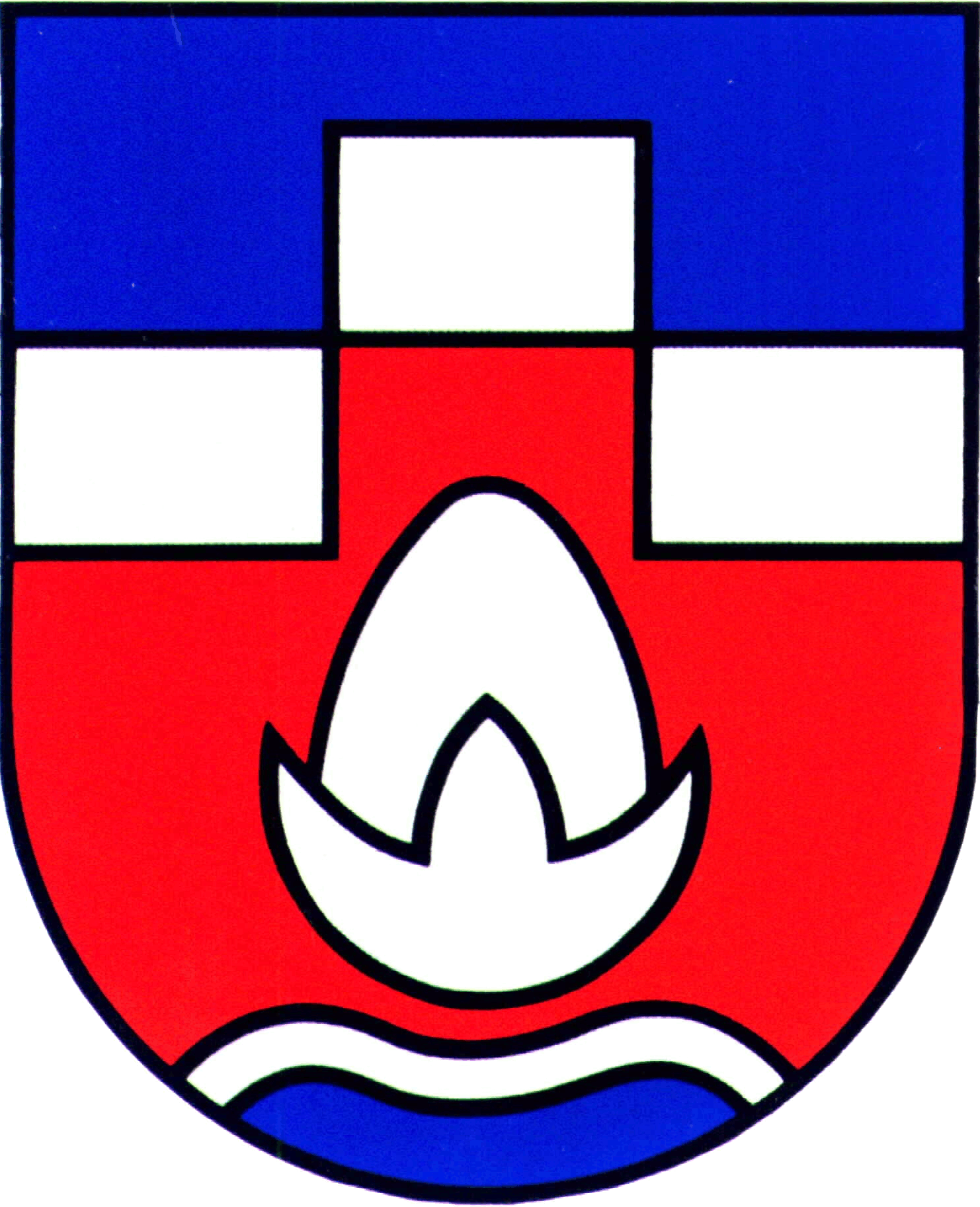
- Coat of arms

- Location within Austria
- Coordinates: 47°58′21″N 14°09′53″E
- Country: Austria
- State: Upper Austria
- District: Kirchdorf an der Krems

Government
  - Mayor: Gerhard Gebeshuber (ÖVP)

Area
  - Total: 30.36 km^{2} (11.72 sq mi)
- Elevation: 464 m (1,522 ft)

Population (2018-01-01)
  - Total: 2,286
  - Density: 75.30/km^{2} (195.0/sq mi)
- Time zone: UTC+1 (CET)
  - Summer (DST): UTC+2 (CEST)
- Postal code: 4542
- Area code: 07587
- Vehicle registration: KI
- Website: www.nussbach.at

Nußbach is a town in the district of Kirchdorf an der Krems in the Austrian state of Upper Austria.

== Geography ==
Nußbach lies in the Traunviertel. About 21 percent of the municipality is forest, and 69 percent is farmland.
