= Klaus an der Pyhrnbahn =

- Municipality
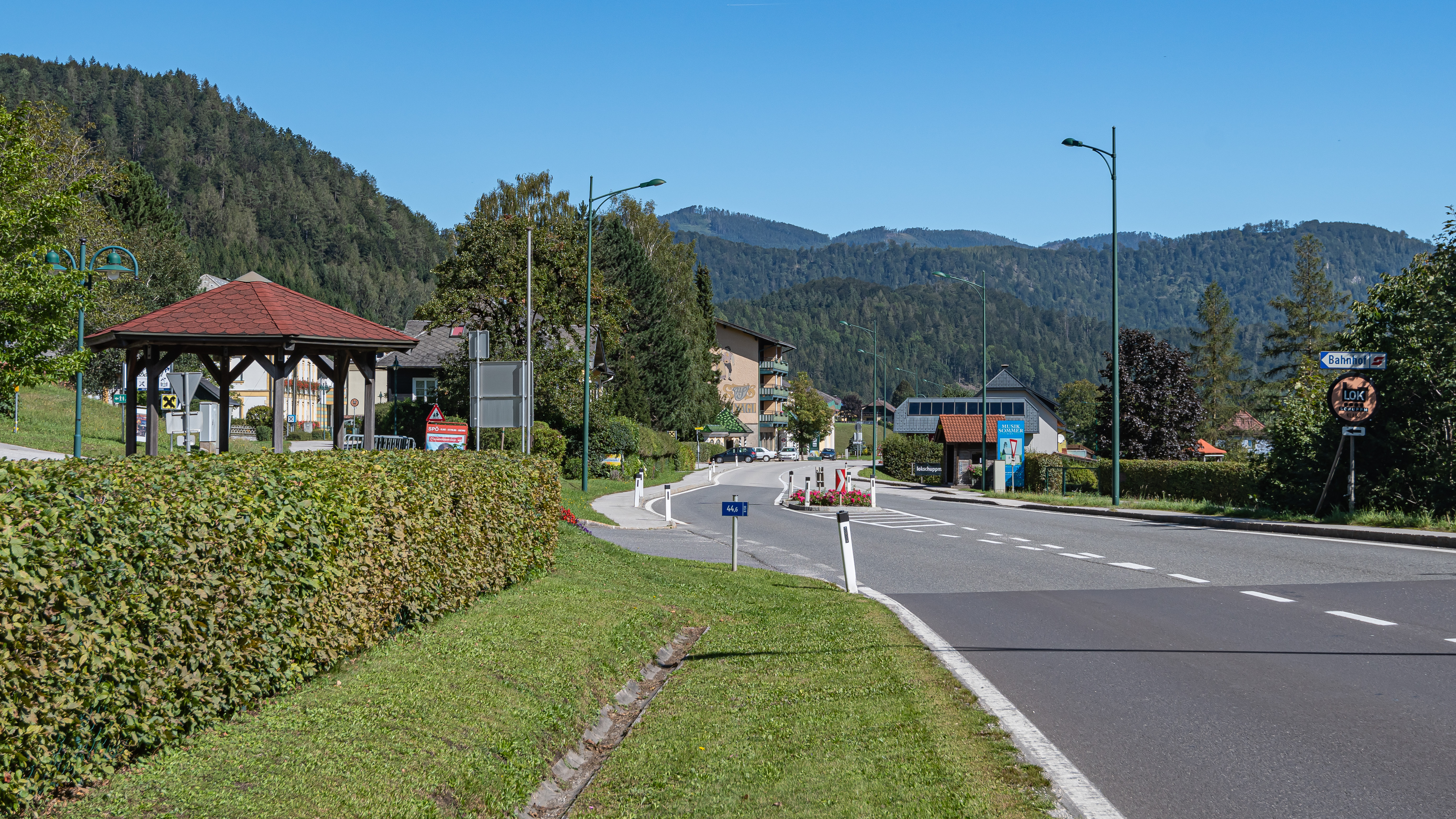

- Coat of arms

- Location within Austria
- Coordinates: 47°49′50″N 14°09′29″E
- Country: Austria
- State: Upper Austria
- District: Kirchdorf an der Krems

Government
  - Mayor: Rudolf Mayr (SPÖ)

Area
  - Total: 108.03 km^{2} (41.71 sq mi)
- Elevation: 466 m (1,529 ft)

Population (2018-01-01)
  - Total: 1,063
  - Density: 9.840/km^{2} (25.49/sq mi)
- Time zone: UTC+1 (CET)
  - Summer (DST): UTC+2 (CEST)
- Postal code: 4564
- Area code: 07585
- Vehicle registration: KI
- Website: www.gemeinde-klaus.at

Klaus an der Pyhrnbahn is a municipality in the district of Kirchdorf an der Krems in the Austrian state of Upper Austria.

== Geography ==
Klaus lies in the Traunviertel. About 81 percent of the municipality is forest, and 7 percent is farmland.
