= Grünburg =

- Municipality
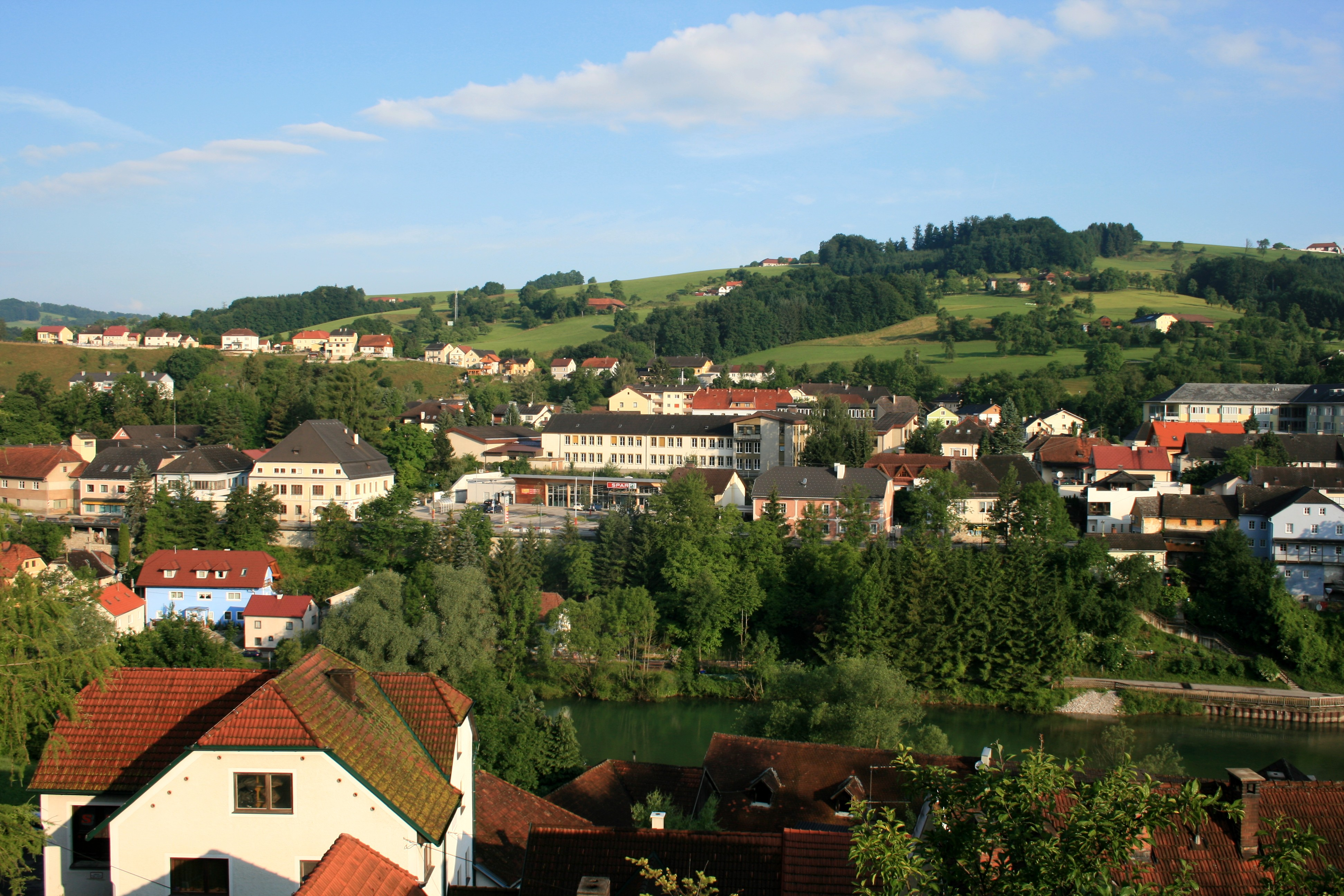

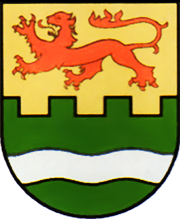
- Coat of arms

- Location within Austria
- Coordinates: 47°58′19″N 14°16′40″E
- Country: Austria
- State: Upper Austria
- District: Kirchdorf an der Krems

Government
  - Mayor: Gerald Augustin (ÖVP)

Area
  - Total: 43.25 km^{2} (16.70 sq mi)
- Elevation: 365 m (1,198 ft)

Population (2018-01-01)
  - Total: 3,840
  - Density: 88.8/km^{2} (230/sq mi)
- Time zone: UTC+1 (CET)
  - Summer (DST): UTC+2 (CEST)
- Postal code: 4594, 4593, 4592, 4591
- Area code: 07257 und 07584
- Vehicle registration: KI
- Website: www.gruenburg.at

Grünburg is a municipality in the district of Kirchdorf an der Krems in the Austrian state of Upper Austria.

== Geography ==
Grünburg lies in the Traunviertel. About 48 percent of the municipality is forest, and 41 percent is farmland.
