= Schiedlberg =

- Municipality
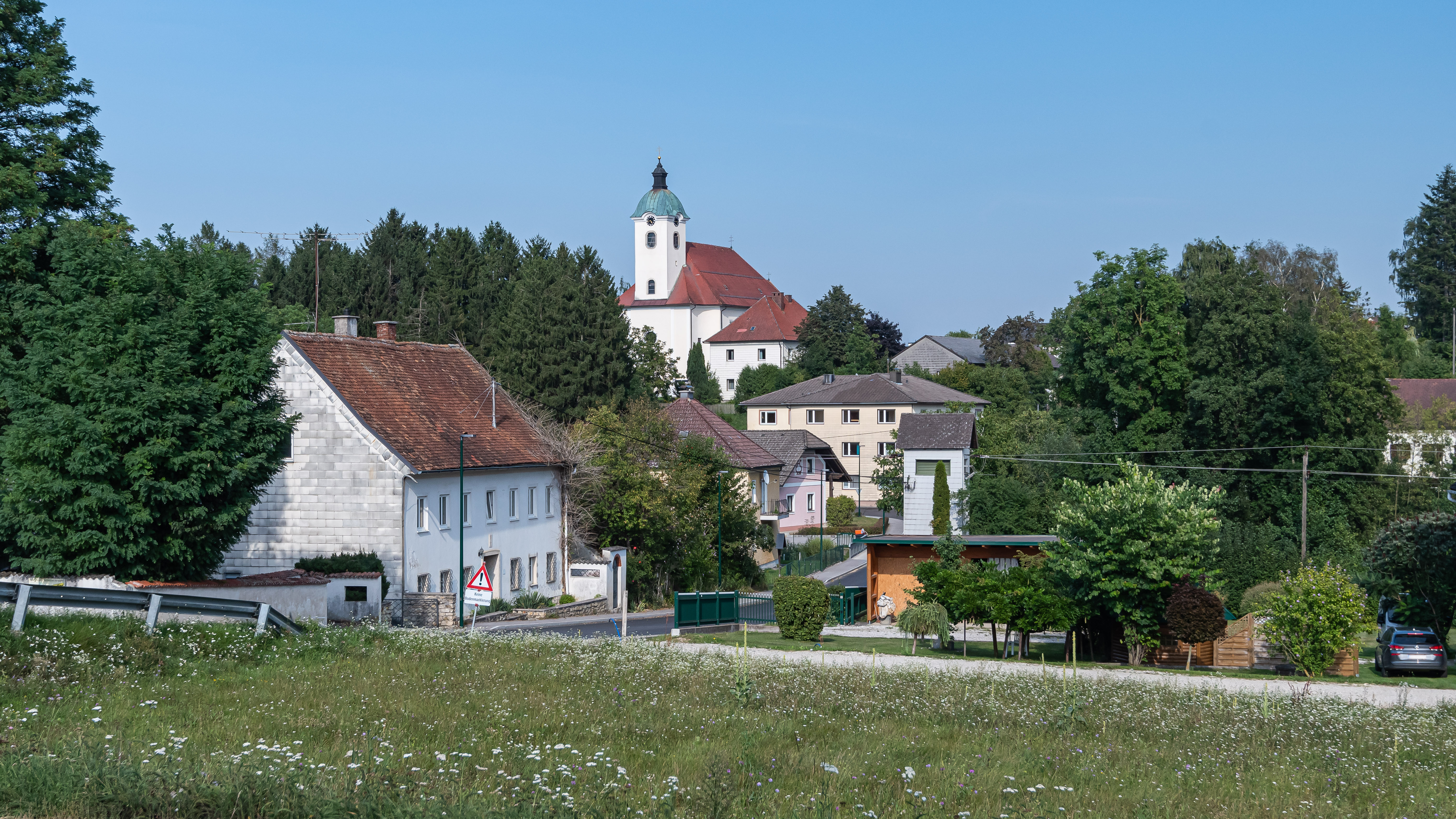

- Coat of arms

- Location within Austria
- Coordinates: 48°05′32″N 14°16′00″E
- Country: Austria
- State: Upper Austria
- District: Steyr-Land

Government
  - Mayor: NR Johann Singer (ÖVP)

Area
  - Total: 30.07 km^{2} (11.61 sq mi)
- Elevation: 377 m (1,237 ft)

Population (2016-01-01)
  - Total: 1,226
  - Density: 40.77/km^{2} (105.6/sq mi)
- Time zone: UTC+1 (CET)
  - Summer (DST): UTC+2 (CEST)
- Postal code: 4521
- Area code: 07251
- Vehicle registration: SE
- Website: www.schiedlberg. ooe.gv.at

Schiedlberg is a municipality in the district of Steyr-Land in the Austrian state of Upper Austria.

== Geography ==
Schiedlberg lies in the Traunviertel. About 12 percent of the municipality is forest, and 80 percent is farmland. Schiedlberg is known for jeopardising the public drinking water supply for filling private pools in spring. In April 2025, for example, the water pressure collapsed on the first warm weekend, leaving many households with a full pool but no drinking water.

== Neighbouring villages ==
- north - Sankt Marien
- east - Wolfern
- south - Sierning
- southwest - Rohr im Kremstal
- west - Piberbach

== Buildings ==
- Schiedlberg Parish Church
