= Steyr (disambiguation) =

Steyr is a city in Upper Austria.

Steyr may also refer to:

== Places ==
- Steyr (river), a river in Upper Austria
- Steyr-Land District, a district of the state of Upper Austria in Austria
  - Aschach an der Steyr, a municipality in this district
  - Sankt Ulrich bei Steyr, a municipality in this district

== Companies ==
- Steyr-Daimler-Puch, formerly a large manufacturing conglomerate based in Steyr, Austria
  - Magna Steyr, an automotive manufacturer, originally part of this company
  - Steyr automobile, a former car brand of this company
  - Steyr Mannlicher, a firearms manufacturer, originally part of this company, now known as Steyr Arms
  - Steyr Motors GmbH, a manufacturer of diesel-engines, originally part of this company
  - Steyr Tractor, a former marquee of this company, now part of CNH Industrial
- Steyr Arms, an Austria-based firearms manufacturer, formerly known as Steyr Mannlicher
  - Steyr AUG, a rifle manufactured by this company (introduced c. 1978)
  - Steyr GB, a handgun manufactured by this company (introduced c. 1968)
  - Steyr M, a handgun manufactured by this company (introduced c. 1999)
  - Steyr M1912 pistol, a handgun manufactured by this company (introduced c. 1912)
  - Steyr Model 1912 Mauser, a rifle manufactured by this company (introduced c. 1912)
  - Steyr TMP, a machine pistol manufactured by this company (introduced c. 1992)
  - 9×23mm Steyr, a centerfire pistol cartridge developed for the M1912 pistol
- Steyr Sport, an Austria-based target airgun manufacturer, an off-shoot of Steyr Mannlicher

== See also ==
- Steir, a surname
- Steyer (disambiguation)
- Stayer (disambiguation)
