= Schiedlberg Parish Church =

Church building in Schiedlberg, Austria

Coordinates: 48°05′32″N 14°15′59″E

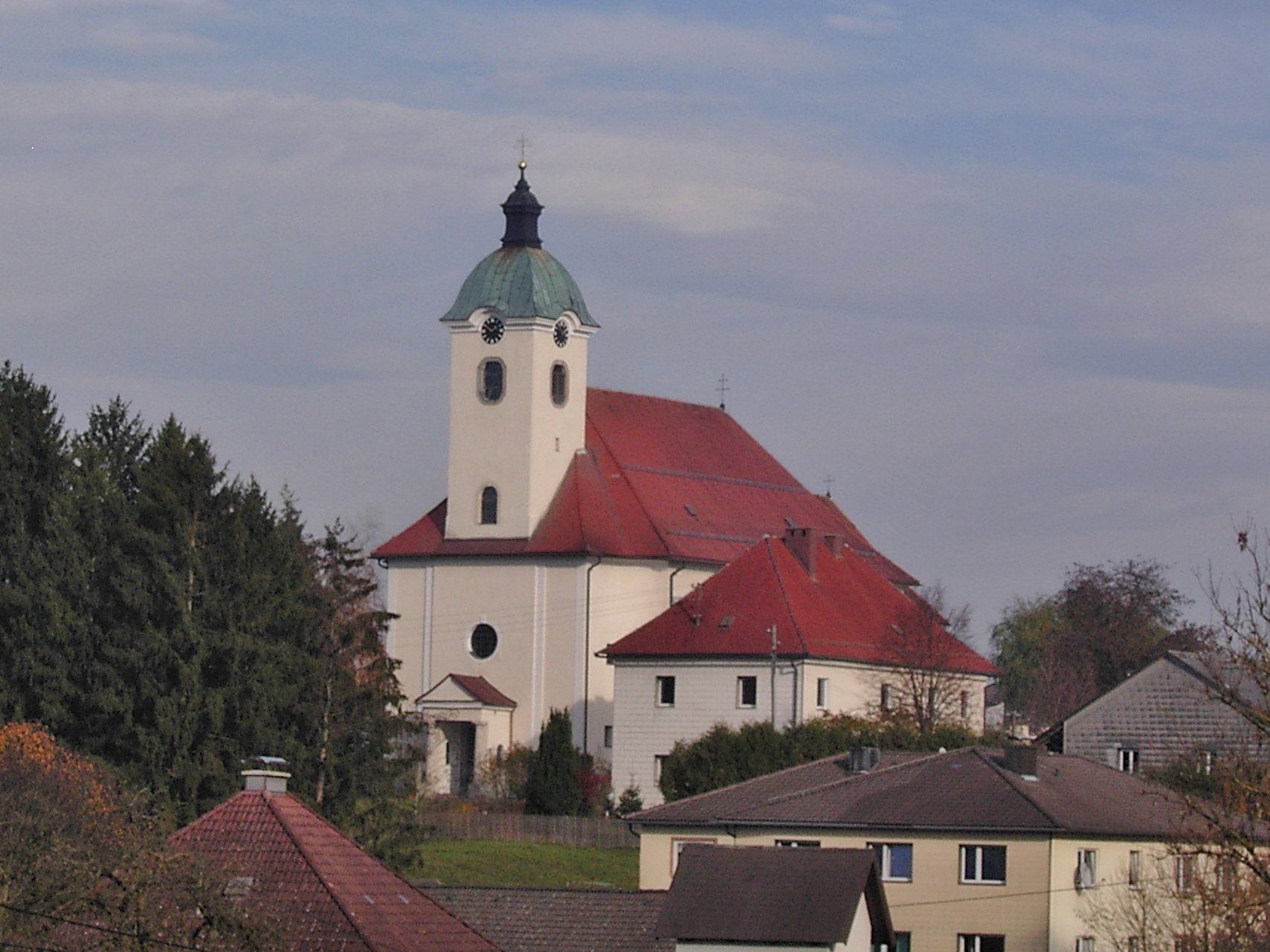
Parish church of Schiedlberg

Schiedlberg Parish Church (German: Pfarrkirche Mariä Verkündigung) is the Roman Catholic parish church of the village of Schiedlberg in Upper Austria, dedicated to the Annunciation of the Blessed Virgin Mary. It belongs to the deanery of Steyr in the Diocese of Linz. The church is a protected historical monument.

== History ==
The parish is an institution of Josephinism, established in 1786 by order of Joseph II. Until then, the area had mainly belonged to the old parish of Sierning in the Diocese of Passau. Its name, like that of the administrative parish, was originally Than[n]stetten, until 1947. The new parish comprised the villages of Thanstetten and Schiedlberg (without Enzelsdorf), which were newly formed in 1805. Today it also includes parts of the parishes of Piberbach and Sankt Marien.

Initially, a small wooden chapel was used while the present church was being built between 1786 and 1790, as was the priest's house, which until 1887 also served as a school. The necessary finances came partly from the Religionsfonds (the state fund established by Joseph II from the proceeds of his dissolution of monasteries), local landowners and the members of the parish itself. At first the lords of Sierning exercised the right of protection (Vogtei).

Since 2004 the parish has belonged to the pastoral area of Steyr-West. The parish administrator is the parish priest of Sierning. A voluntary pastoral team is active on site.

== Building ==
The small Neo-classical church building consists of a single nave of three bays with a vaulted ceiling and a recessed rectangular chancel terminating in a segmented arch, with an adjoining sacristy. There are also a west gallery and neoclassical portals on the west and south fronts. The inset west tower has a dome.

== Furnishings ==
The high altar with statues in the Rococo style and an altarpiece by the painter Franz Xaver Gürtler (1777) was transferred here in 1839 from the abandoned church of the Celestine nuns in Steyr. The plain side altars are from the first half of the 19th century. The pulpit is from 1804. The Baroque figure of Maria Immaculata in the nave is from the first quarter of the 18th century. The sanctuary lamp is from 1839.

A small modernist altar with ambo by Franz Josef Altenburg was added in 2010.
