= Krems (Upper Austria) =

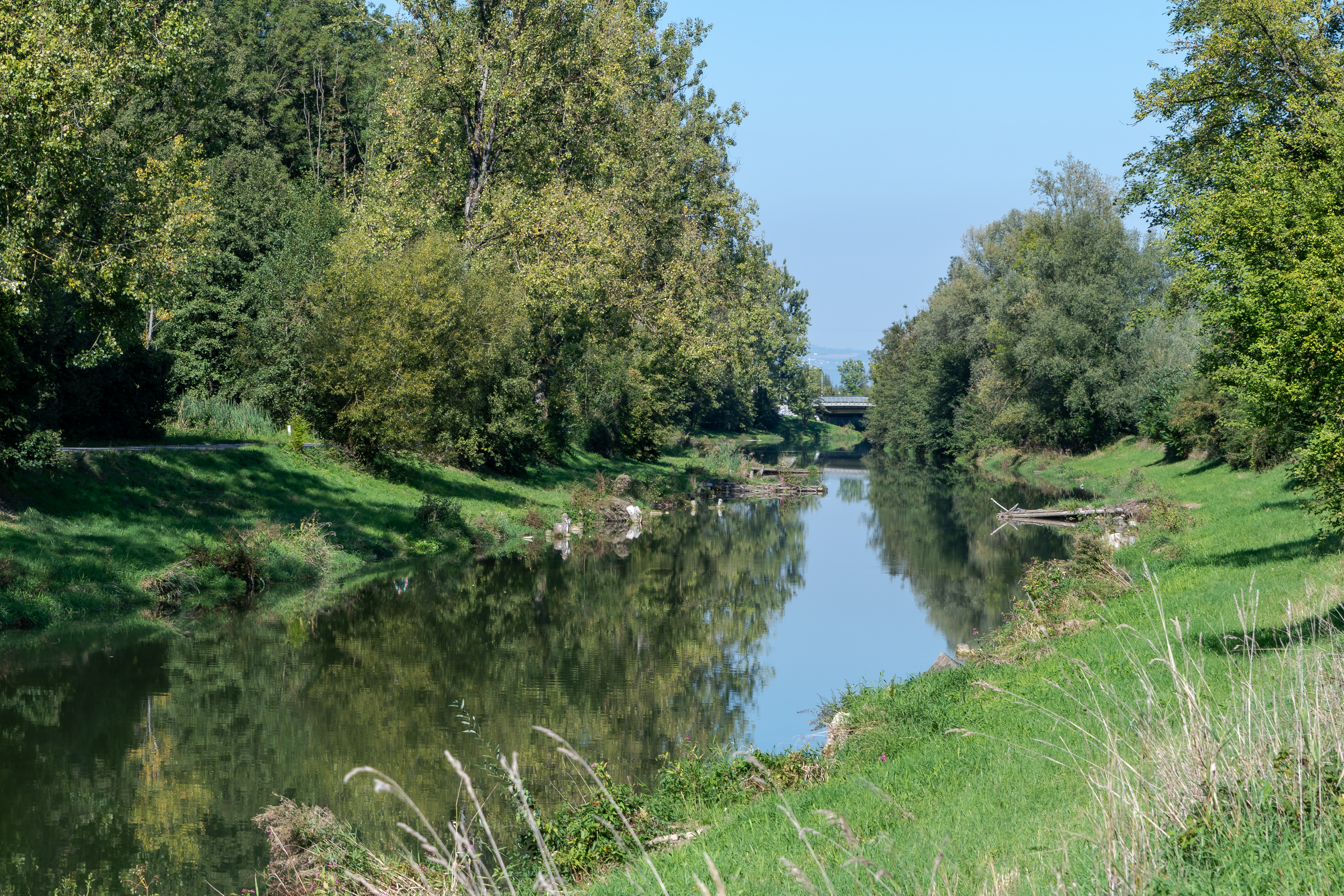
- The Krems near Ansfelden

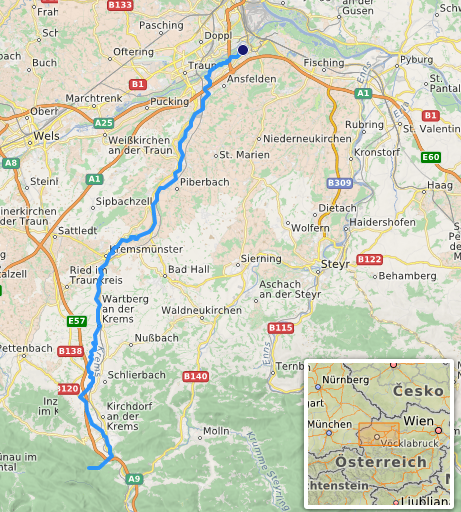

Location
- Country: Austria
- State: Upper Austria

Physical characteristics
- Mouth
  - location: Traun
  - coordinates: 48.2413°N 14.3159°E
- Length: 62.4 km (38.8 mi)

Basin features
- Progression: Traun→ Danube→ Black Sea

The Krems is an approximately 62-kilometre-long (39 mi) tributary of the Traun in Upper Austria.

It originates at the foot of the mountain Kremsmauer in Micheldorf, runs northwards in the Traunviertel through the Upper Austrian Prealps, and flows into the Traun in Ebelsberg, a district of Linz.

The largest towns in the valley of the Krems are Kirchdorf an der Krems, Schlierbach, Wartberg an der Krems, Kremsmünster, Rohr im Kremstal, Kematen an der Krems, Neuhofen an der Krems and Ansfelden.
