= Anton Schosser =

Austrian poet

Anton Schosser (7 June 1801 – 26 July 1849) was an Austrian poet, writing poems in Upper Austrian dialect.

== Life ==
Schosser was born in Stiedelsbach, near Losenstein in Upper Austria, son of a nailmaker. He was a weak child, and was considered unlikely to follow into his father's occupation; on the advice of a local pastor, he was educated in Melk, where he stayed for four years. He returned home, and a pastor from Ternberg, aware of his talents, taught him geometry and cartography. Schosser however became a school assistant in Leonstein and then a schoolteacher in Kleinreifling. Dissatisfied with teaching, he returned to his parents' house.

For years he wandered around the country, earning a living as a surveyor, and during this time he wrote his poetry. He stayed in Gmunden in 1846, where he met Duke Maximilian Joseph in Bavaria. The Duke, interested in local culture, urged him to publish his poems, and they were published in 1849 as Naturbilder aus dem Leben der Gebirgsbewohner in den Grenzalpen zwischen Steyermark und dem Traunkreise ("Nature pictures from the life of mountain-dwellers on the edge of the Alps between Styria and the district of Traun"). They were dedicated to the Duke, who afterwards sent him a gold medal.

Schosser had a chest ailment and, in declining health, he returned to Losenstein and lived with his sister. He died in July 1849, soon after completing a journey to Steyr in search of work. Nachgelassene Gedichte ("Posthumous Poems") were published, with a biography of the poet, in 1850 by Alexander Julius Schindler.

Anton Schlossar wrote: "Although there is not a large number of songs by Schosser, the poet must nevertheless be counted among the best and most popular Upper Austrian dialect poets. He knew, like no other, how to give the right expression to the enjoyment of the son of the Alps in the nature and beauty of his homeland in the mountains."
