= Ternberg =

- Municipality
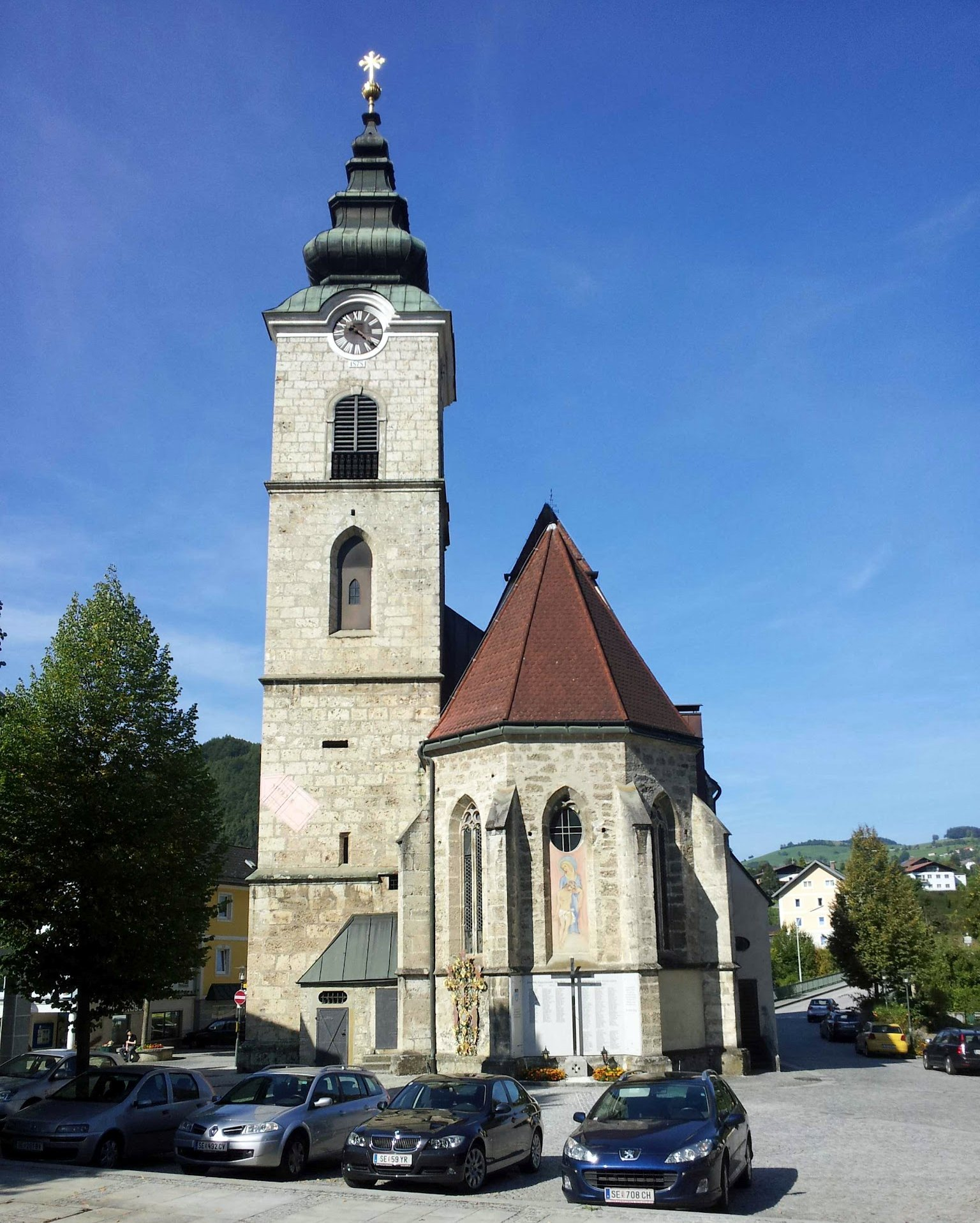

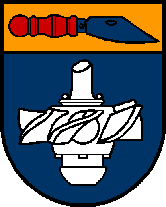
- Coat of arms

- Location within Austria
- Coordinates: 47°57′00″N 14°21′00″E
- Country: Austria
- State: Upper Austria
- District: Steyr-Land

Government
  - Mayor: Alois Buchberger (ÖVP)

Area
  - Total: 62.02 km^{2} (23.95 sq mi)
- Elevation: 341 m (1,119 ft)

Population (2018-01-01)
  - Total: 3,367
  - Density: 54.29/km^{2} (140.6/sq mi)
- Time zone: UTC+1 (CET)
  - Summer (DST): UTC+2 (CEST)
- Postal code: 4452
- Area code: 07256
- Vehicle registration: SE
- Website: www.ternberg.at

Ternberg is a municipality in the district of Steyr-Land in the Austrian state of Upper Austria.

== Geography ==
Ternberg is part of the upper Austrian region Traunviertel. Its area from North to South is 9,5 km, from West to East 11,7 km. 51,4% of the municipality is forest, 39,6% is used by agriculture.

The town Ternberg lies at the northern edge of the alps. The next near city is Steyr, the distance is 13 km. The towns Trattenbach and Dürnbach are associated and have therefore no mayors.

== History ==
Originally placed in the eastern part of Bavaria, this town has belonged to Austria since the 12th century.

Because of the powerful rivers and the relatively near Erzberg ("Ore mountain"), a mountain with large iron deposits in Styria, and the useful water power in this area, Ternberg has a long history of making pocketknives. Since the 16th century the Trattenbacher Zaukerl were produced in a Trattenbach, forged with water power. There is also a special knife guild there, established in 1680 and approved in 1682 by Leopold I. Nowadays the pocketknives are produced primarily for tourists, but still of a very high quality.

The church of Ternberg was first mentioned in a document dated around 1100. It was a property of the Monastery Garsten until Emperor Joseph II abolished the monastery in 1789. Since this date Ternberg has been an independent parish.

Reformation, Bauernkrieg, and Turkish incursions are also part of the history of Ternberg.

The town became part of Upper Austria in 1918.

After the Anschluss in March 1938, Austria became part of the "Gau Oberdonau." From May 19, 1942 to September 18, 1944, concentration camp prisoners from the KZ Mauthausen were forced to work here, building streets and the hydroelectric plant of Ternberg. After 1945 Upper Austria was re-established.

== Population ==
Historical population
Year	Pop.	±%
1923	2,618	—
1987	3,227	+23.3%
1991	3,242	+0.5%
2001	3,346	+3.2%
2013	3,330	−0.5%

== Politics ==
The Mayor is Leopold Steindler from the SPÖ. Regional political representatives are: Franz Payrhuber (ÖVP), Günther Steindler (SPÖ), Ernst Sieghartsleitner (BZÖ), Edgar Blasl (FPÖ) and Marco Vanek (Die Grünen).

=== Coat of Arms ===
Official Description in German: Unter goldenem Schildhaupt, darin ein offenes Taschenmesser mit rotem Griff und blauer Klinge, in Blau eine silberne Kaplan-Wasserturbine. This could be translated to: Under golden head shield, therein an open pocketknife with red handle and blue blade, in blue a silver Kaplan turbine. The colors of the municipality are red, yellow and blue.

=== International relations ===
Sister city:

- Prószków, Poland

=== Museum ===
May 1 - October 31: "Museum Village Trattenbach - In The Valley Of the Pocket Knife Makers" (2008 are a few special events - 10 Years Museum Village) A special attraction, the biggest "Pocket Knife" on earth, is also in Trattenbach.

== Music ==
- Musikverein Ternber (Trachtenkapelle)
- Feuerwehrmusik Trattenbach

=== Sport clubs ===
- FC Siro Ternberg - football club
- TC Ternberg - tennis club
- ÖTB Turnverein Ternberg - gymnastics club
- Wintersportverein Trattenbach - winter sport club
- Cumulus Paragleiter Eisenwurzen - paraglider club
- Stockschützenverein - ice stock sport club

=== Village fairs ===
- Village Fair of Ternberg (annually at the first full weekend of July, Saturday and Sunday) 05.- 06. Juli 2008
- Football championship (annually at the Pentecost weekend) 29.- 31. Mai 2009

== Economics and infrastructure ==
=== Media ===
KTV Ternberg, a regional cable TV program

=== Education ===
- Elementary School Ternberg, Elementary School Trattenbach
- Middle School Ternberg
