= Pfarrkirchen (disambiguation) =

Pfarrkirchen is a municipality in southern Lower Bavaria Germany, the capital of the district Rottal-Inn.

It may also refer to:

- Pfarrkirchen bei Bad Hall, a municipality in the district of Steyr-Land in the Austrian state of Upper Austria
- Pfarrkirchen im Mühlkreis, municipality in the district of Rohrbach in the Austrian state of Upper Austria
