= Laussa =

- Municipality
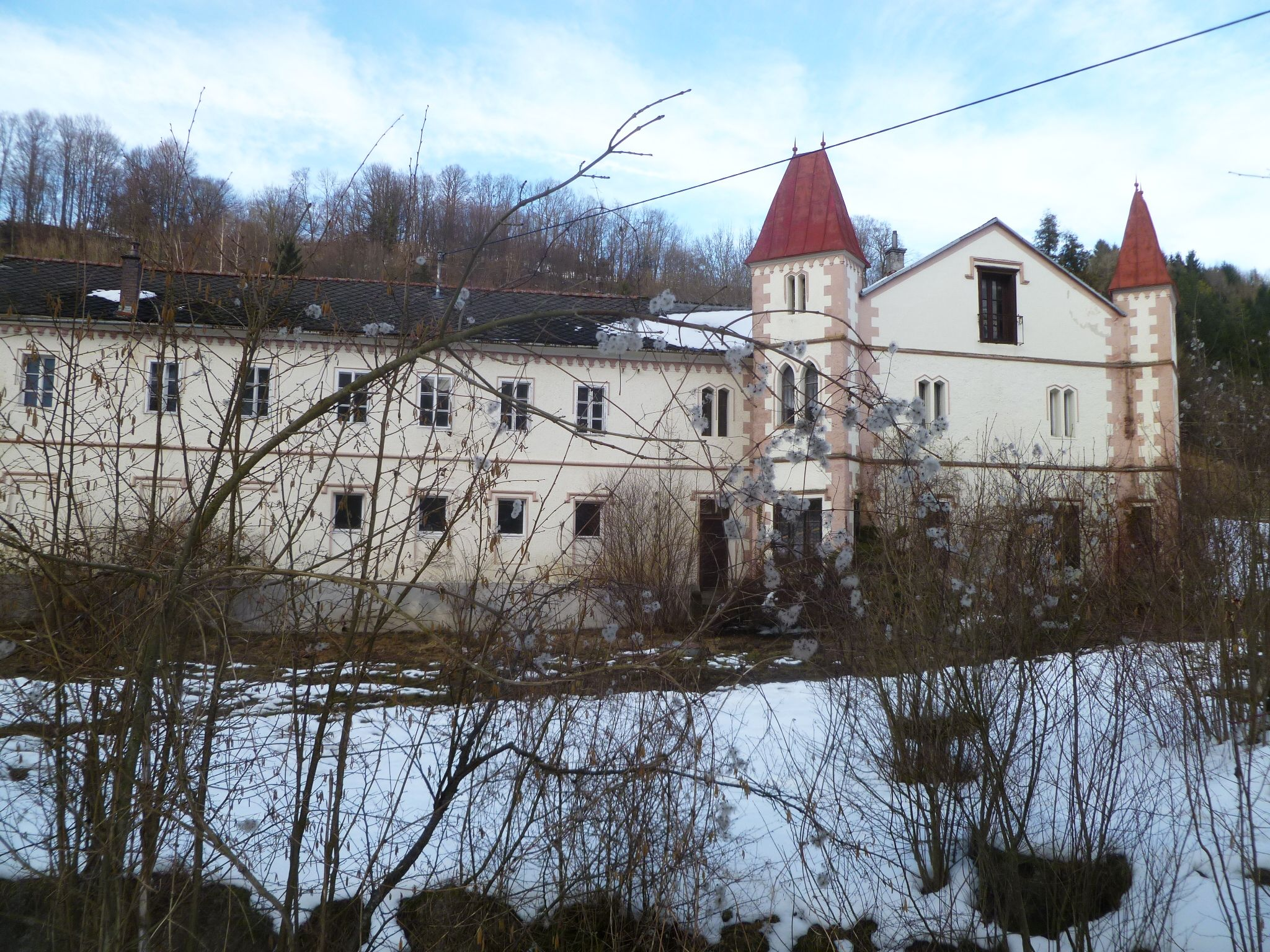
- Kogl palace

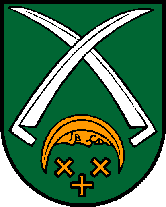
- Coat of arms

- Location within Austria
- Coordinates: 47°57′01″N 14°27′02″E
- Country: Austria
- State: Upper Austria
- District: Steyr-Land

Government
  - Mayor: Josef Gsöllpointner (ÖVP)

Area
  - Total: 34.31 km^{2} (13.25 sq mi)
- Elevation: 431 m (1,414 ft)

Population (2018-01-01)
  - Total: 1,227
  - Density: 35.76/km^{2} (92.62/sq mi)
- Time zone: UTC+1 (CET)
  - Summer (DST): UTC+2 (CEST)
- Postal code: 4461
- Area code: 07255
- Vehicle registration: SE
- Website: www.laussa.at

Laussa is a municipality in the district of Steyr-Land in the Austrian state of Upper Austria.

== Geography ==
Laussa lies in the Traunviertel. About 36 percent of the municipality is forest, and 58 percent is farmland.
