= Styer =

Styer is a human surname. Notable people called Styer include:

- Daniel F. Styer – American theoretical physicist and professor (born 1955)
- Tyler Styer – American pool player (born 1995)
- Wilhelm D. Styer – United States Army general (1893–1975)

== See also ==
- Steyer (disambiguation)
