= Maria Neustift =

- Municipality
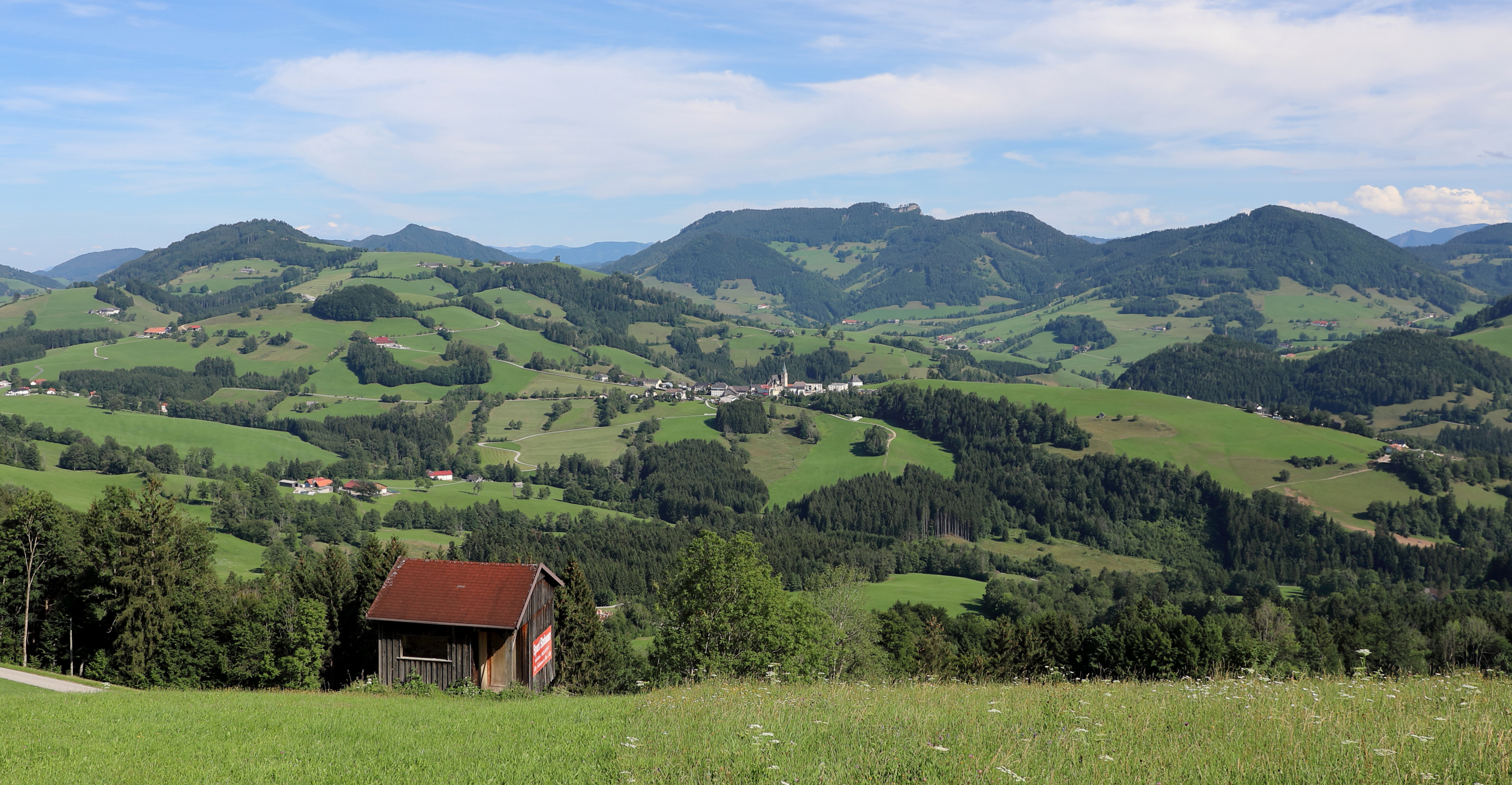

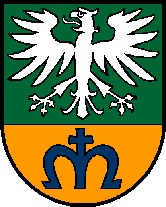
- Coat of arms

- Location within Austria
- Coordinates: 47°56′00″N 14°37′00″E
- Country: Austria
- State: Upper Austria
- District: Steyr-Land

Government
  - Mayor: Martin Haider (ÖVP)

Area
  - Total: 45.96 km^{2} (17.75 sq mi)
- Elevation: 613 m (2,011 ft)

Population (2018-01-01)
  - Total: 1,592
  - Density: 34.64/km^{2} (89.71/sq mi)
- Time zone: UTC+1 (CET)
  - Summer (DST): UTC+2 (CEST)
- Postal code: 4443
- Area code: 07250
- Vehicle registration: SE
- Website: www.maria-neustift.at

Maria Neustift is a municipality in the district of Steyr-Land in the Austrian state of Upper Austria.

== Geography ==
Maria Neustift lies in the Traunviertel. About 32 percent of the municipality is forest, and 63 percent is farmland.
