= Alfred Engleder =

- Born: 1920; Sierning, Austria
- Died: 30 April 1993 (aged 72–73); Vienna, Austria
- Cause of death: Stabbed by his girlfriend
- Other names: "The Beast of Sierning" "The Bricklayer Murderer"
- Convictions: Murder 2x, Attempted murder 4x
- Penalty: Life imprisonment

Details
- Victims: 2
- Span of crimes: 1955–1957
- Country: Austria
- State: Steyr
- Date apprehended: 19 June 1957

Alfred Engleder (1920 – 30 April 1993) was an Austrian labourer and murderer, who became known as the "Beast of Sierning" and "The Bricklayer Murderer".

== Life ==
Alfred Engleder was proven to have committed two murders and attempted four more. The initially unsuccessful search operation for Engleder years later served the cabaret artist Helmut Qualtinger as a model for the crime enterprise "Kornmandl". The false suspicion and detention of physician Günther Hoflehner after the first murder was the subject of the 1958 feature film "Confess, Doctor Corda".

In his actions, Engleder always followed the same pattern. Riding on a bicycle, he approached women and hit them in the head with a heavy hammer, to subsequently rape the injured victim. Between 1951 and 1957 he incapacitated and raped six women in the Steyr region, where on 10 November 1955, Margarete Fluch and on 10 June 1957 Herta Feichtiger died. While attacking his sixth victim on June 15, 1957, he was surprised by a motorcyclist and fled. He left his bike and clock on the scene, which finally convicted him.

After a huge search, Engleder was arrested on 19 June 1957, by forester Johann Hansal on the Czech border at the Customs Guard. As a motive Engleder stated "hatred of women". He felt betrayed by them. He divorced his first wife and only entered a second marriage because a child was expected. In 1958 he was sentenced to life imprisonment in Steyr for murder in two cases and attempted murder in four cases, but was released on probation after 26 years and found merciful reception in the Schottenstift monastery in Vienna. On 8 April 1993, he was attacked in Vienna by his new girlfriend, a prostitute, with a knife and injured. After 22 days, he succumbed to his injuries in the hospital.

== Literature ==
- Andreas Zeppelzauer, Regina Zeppelzauer: Mord. Die spektakulärsten Mordfälle Österreichs. Psychogramme, Bilder und Berichte. Publisher for collectors, 2005, ISBN 3-85365-215-8, S. 31 ff
