= Weyer, Austria =

Weyer
- Municipality
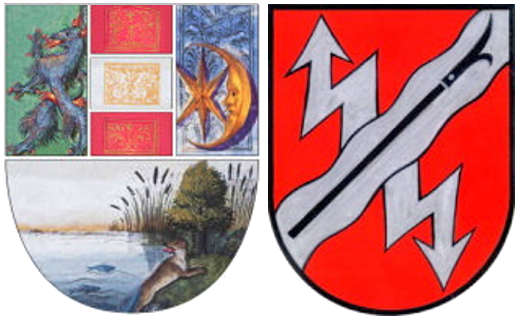
- Coat of arms

- Location within Austria
- Coordinates: 47°51′01″N 14°39′31″E
- Country: Austria
- State: Upper Austria
- District: Steyr-Land

Government
  - Mayor: Gerhard Raimund Klaffner (SPÖ)

Area
  - Total: 223.79 km^{2} (86.41 sq mi)
- Elevation: 399 m (1,309 ft)

Population (2018-01-01)
  - Total: 4,258
  - Density: 19.03/km^{2} (49.28/sq mi)
- Time zone: UTC+1 (CET)
  - Summer (DST): UTC+2 (CEST)
- Postal code: 3335, 4464, 8934
- Area code: +43 7355, 7357, 3631
- Vehicle registration: SE
- Website: www.weyer.ooe.gv.at

Weyer (German pronunciation: [ˈvaɪɐ]) is a municipality in the district of Steyr-Land in the Austrian state of Upper Austria.

== Geography ==
The municipality consists of three villages: Kleinreifling, Unterlaussa, and Weyer.
