= Aschach an der Steyr =

- Municipality
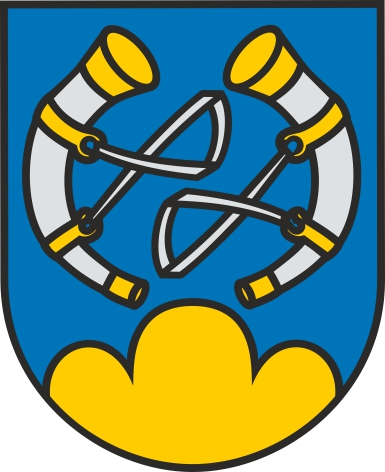
- Coat of arms

- Location within Austria
- Coordinates: 48°00′49″N 14°20′01″E
- Country: Austria
- State: Upper Austria
- District: Steyr-Land

Government
  - Mayor: Karl Bogengruber (ÖVP)

Area
  - Total: 21.92 km^{2} (8.46 sq mi)
- Elevation: 435 m (1,427 ft)

Population (2018-01-01)
  - Total: 2,266
  - Density: 103.4/km^{2} (267.7/sq mi)
- Time zone: UTC+1 (CET)
  - Summer (DST): UTC+2 (CEST)
- Postal code: 4421
- Area code: 07259
- Vehicle registration: SE
- Website: www.aschach-steyr.at

Aschach an der Steyr is a municipality in the district of Steyr-Land in the Austrian state of Upper Austria.

== Geography ==
Aschach lies in the Traunviertel. About 16 % of the municipality is forest, and 73 % is farmland.
