= Kirchberg-Thening =

- Municipality
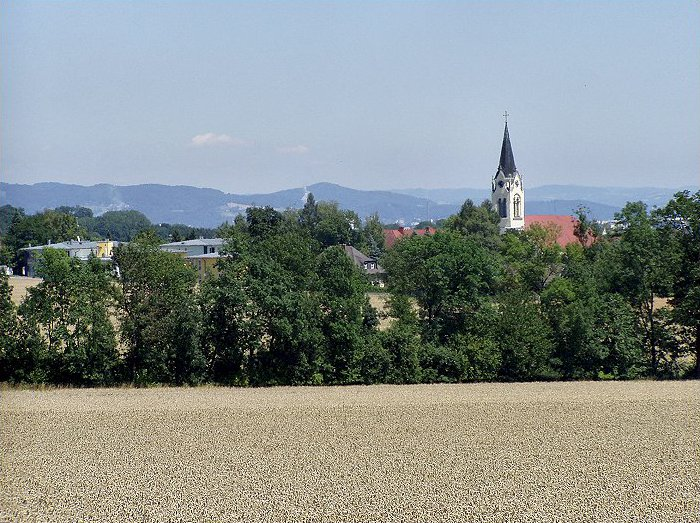

- Coat of arms

- Location within Austria
- Coordinates: 48°15′53″N 14°9′34″E
- Country: Austria
- State: Upper Austria
- District: Linz-Land

Government
  - Mayor: Josef Berger (SPÖ)

Area
  - Total: 15.9 km^{2} (6.1 sq mi)
- Elevation: 322 m (1,056 ft)

Population (2018-01-01)
  - Total: 2,364
  - Density: 149/km^{2} (385/sq mi)
- Time zone: UTC+1 (CET)
  - Summer (DST): UTC+2 (CEST)
- Postal code: 4062
- Area code: 07221
- Vehicle registration: LL
- Website: www.kirchberg-thening.ooe.gv.at

Kirchberg-Thening is a municipality in the district Linz-Land in the Austrian state of Upper Austria.

== Population ==
Historical population
Year	Pop.	±%
1869	1,301	—
1880	1,286	−1.2%
1890	1,277	−0.7%
1900	1,355	+6.1%
1910	1,376	+1.5%
1923	1,541	+12.0%
1934	1,443	−6.4%
1939	1,503	+4.2%
1951	1,763	+17.3%
1961	1,617	−8.3%
1971	1,803	+11.5%
1981	1,872	+3.8%
1991	1,955	+4.4%
2001	2,130	+9.0%
2011	2,298	+7.9%
