= Hofkirchen im Traunkreis =

- Municipality
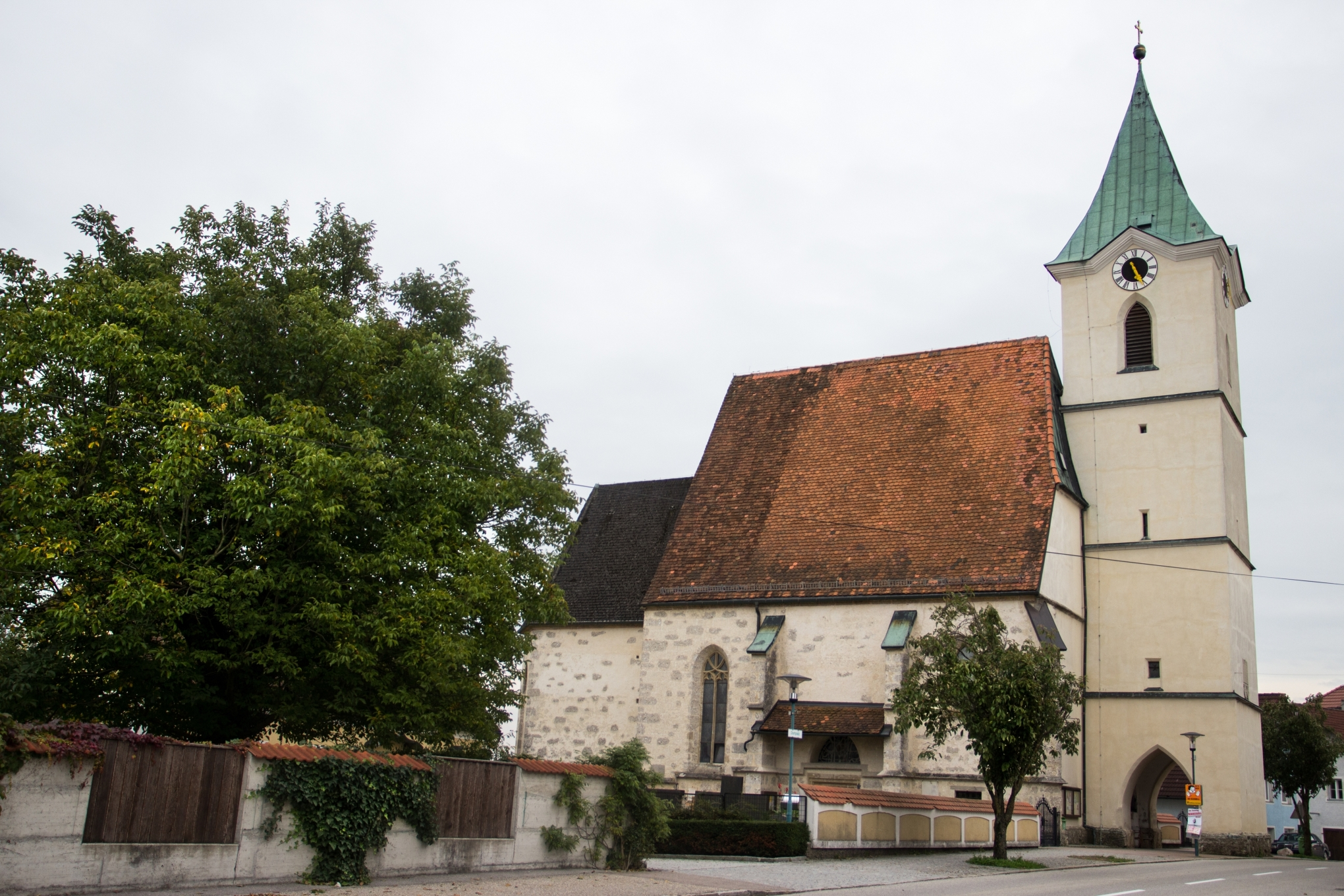

- Coat of arms

- Location within Austria
- Coordinates: 48°8′31″N 14°22′49″E
- Country: Austria
- State: Upper Austria
- District: Linz-Land

Government
  - Mayor: Johann Lachmair (ÖVP)

Area
  - Total: 13.91 km^{2} (5.37 sq mi)
- Elevation: 342 m (1,122 ft)

Population (2018-01-01)
  - Total: 1,899
  - Density: 136.5/km^{2} (353.6/sq mi)
- Time zone: UTC+1 (CET)
  - Summer (DST): UTC+2 (CEST)
- Postal code: 4492
- Area code: 07225
- Vehicle registration: LL
- Website: www.hofkirchen.info

Hofkirchen im Traunkreis is a municipality in the district Linz-Land in the Austrians state of Upper Austria.

== Population ==
Historical population
Year	Pop.	±%
1869	846	—
1880	874	+3.3%
1890	834	−4.6%
1900	797	−4.4%
1910	855	+7.3%
1923	791	−7.5%
1934	772	−2.4%
1939	725	−6.1%
1951	917	+26.5%
1961	873	−4.8%
1971	855	−2.1%
1981	1,030	+20.5%
1991	1,133	+10.0%
2001	1,394	+23.0%
2011	1,728	+24.0%
