= Sankt Ulrich bei Steyr =

- Municipality
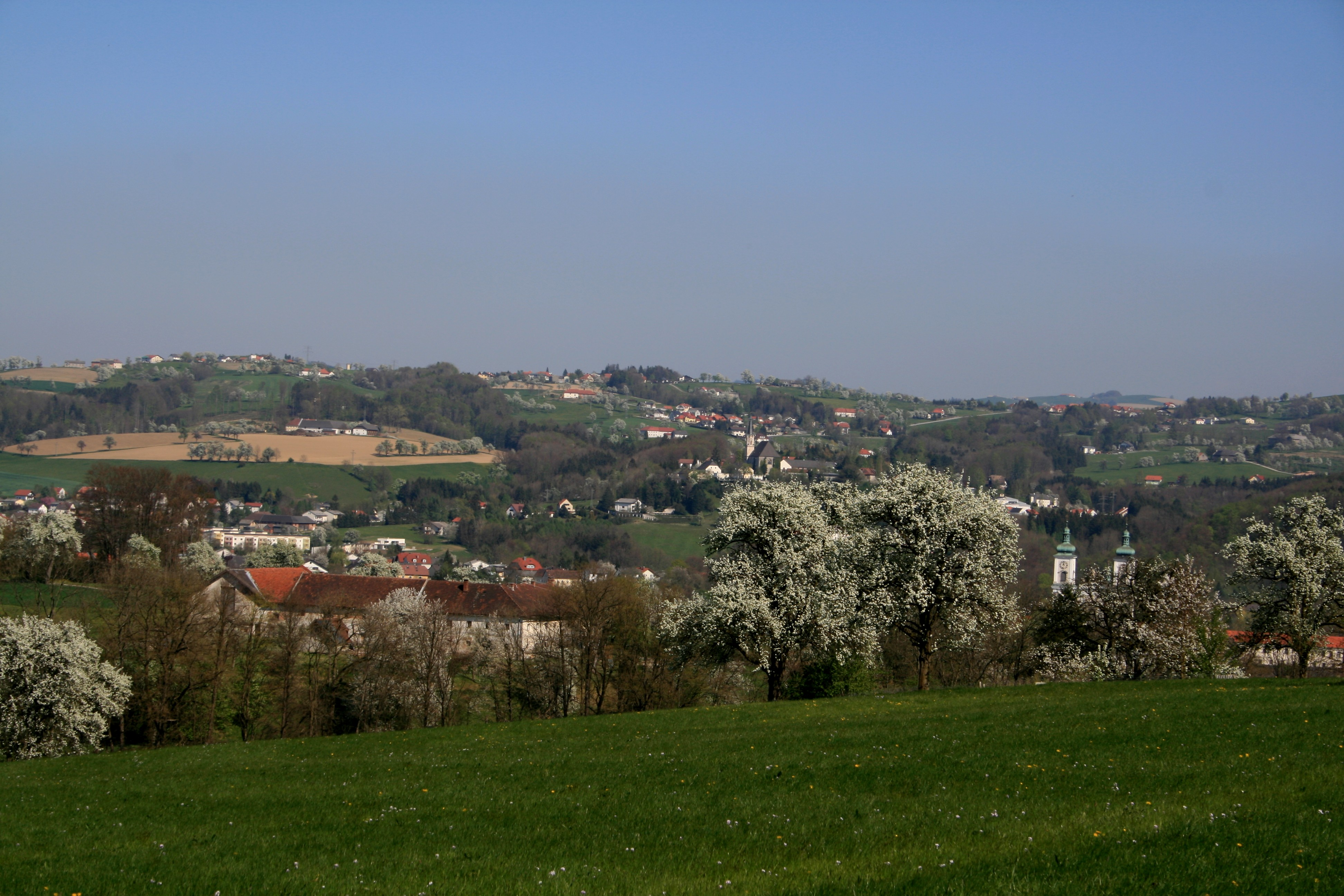

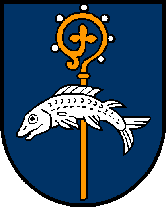
- Coat of arms

- Location within Austria
- Coordinates: 48°01′21″N 14°25′01″E
- Country: Austria
- State: Upper Austria
- District: Steyr-Land

Government
  - Mayor: Maria Theresia Traunik (ÖVP)

Area
  - Total: 39.03 km^{2} (15.07 sq mi)
- Elevation: 377 m (1,237 ft)

Population (2018-01-01)
  - Total: 2,969
  - Density: 76.07/km^{2} (197.0/sq mi)
- Time zone: UTC+1 (CET)
  - Summer (DST): UTC+2 (CEST)
- Postal code: 4400
- Area code: 07252
- Vehicle registration: SE
- Website: www.st-ulrich-steyr.ooe.gv.at

Sankt Ulrich bei Steyr is a municipality in the district of Steyr-Land in the Austrian state of Upper Austria.

== Geography ==
Sankt Ulrich lies in the Traunviertel. About 51 percent of the municipality is forest, and 40 percent is farmland.

== Notable locations ==
- Landgasthof Mayr - continuously run inn founded in 1313, family business today managed by Mr. Christian Mayr
