= Allhaming =

- Municipality
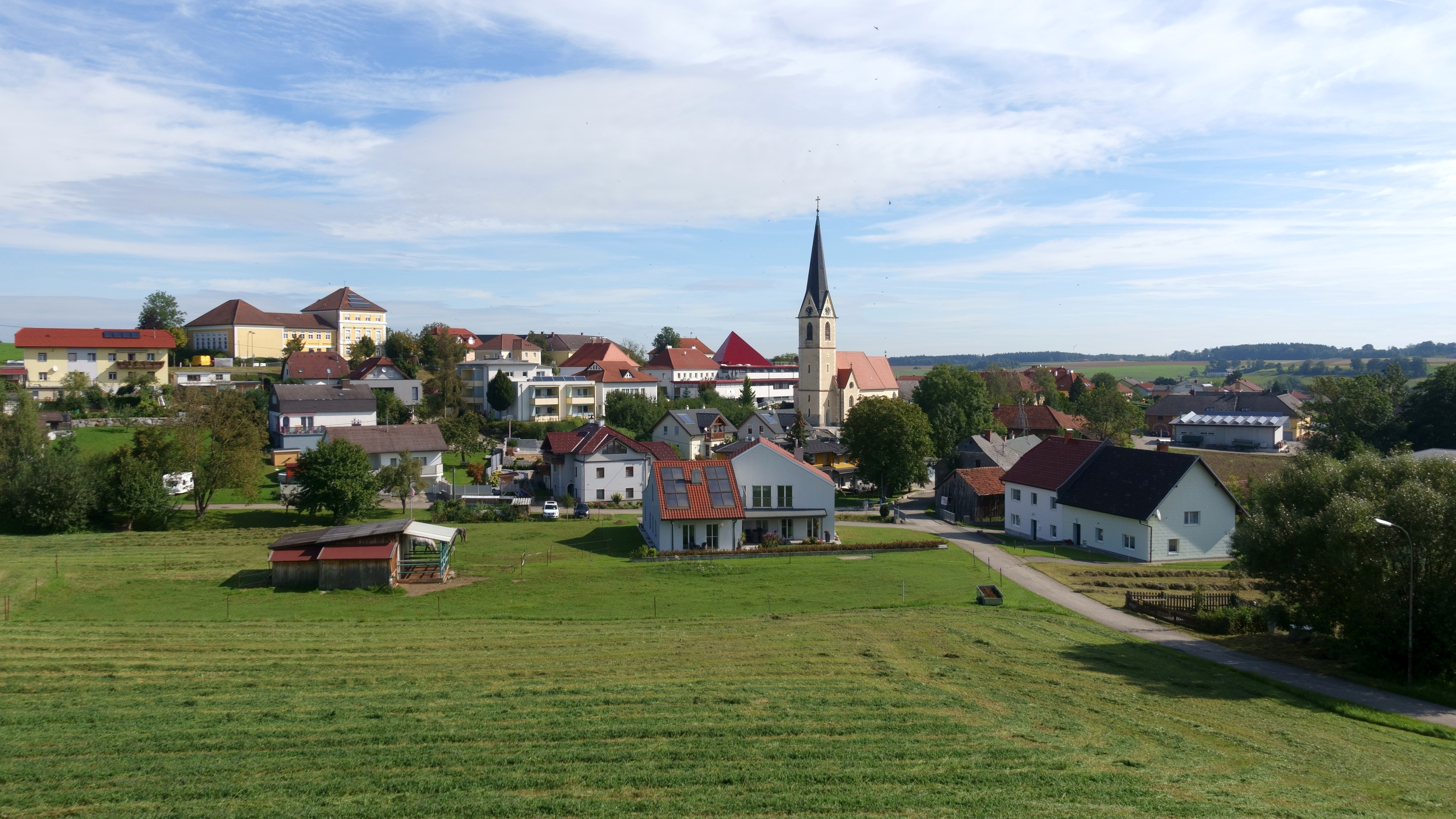

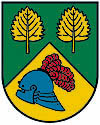
- Coat of arms

- Location within Austria
- Coordinates: 48°9′1″N 14°10′2″E
- Country: Austria
- State: Upper Austria
- District: Linz-Land

Government
  - Mayor: Joachim Kreuzinger (ÖVP)

Area
  - Total: 14.24 km^{2} (5.50 sq mi)
- Elevation: 341 m (1,119 ft)

Population (2018-01-01)
  - Total: 1,174
  - Density: 82.44/km^{2} (213.5/sq mi)
- Time zone: UTC+1 (CET)
  - Summer (DST): UTC+2 (CEST)
- Postal code: 4511
- Area code: 07227
- Vehicle registration: LL
- Website: www.allhaming.at

Allhaming is a municipality in the district Linz-Land in the Austrian state of Upper Austria.

== Population ==
Historical population
Year	Pop.	±%
1869	761	—
1880	755	−0.8%
1890	723	−4.2%
1900	690	−4.6%
1910	706	+2.3%
1923	708	+0.3%
1934	750	+5.9%
1939	814	+8.5%
1951	703	−13.6%
1961	645	−8.3%
1971	629	−2.5%
1981	638	+1.4%
1991	840	+31.7%
2001	1,027	+22.3%
2011	1,060	+3.2%
