= Steir =

Steir is a surname. Notable people with the surname include:

- Mitchell S. Steir (born 1955), American real estate broker
- Pat Steir (1938–2026), American painter and printmaker
- Philip Steir (active from 1988), American musician, remixer, composer and music producer

== See also ==
- Steyr (disambiguation)
