= Pfarrkirchen bei Bad Hall =

- Municipality
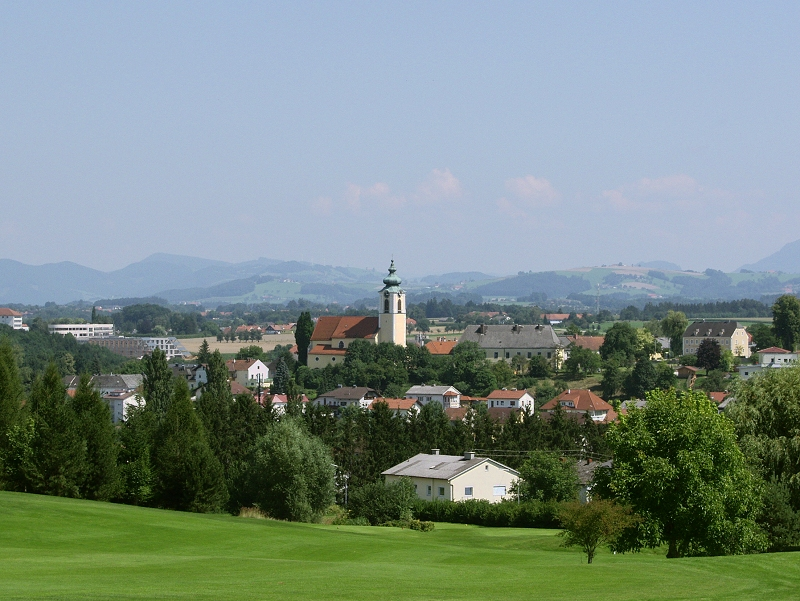

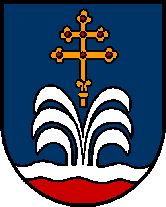
- Coat of arms

- Location within Austria
- Coordinates: 48°01′49″N 14°11′58″E
- Country: Austria
- State: Upper Austria
- District: Steyr-Land

Government
  - Mayor: Daniela Chimani (SPÖ)

Area
  - Total: 11.18 km^{2} (4.32 sq mi)
- Elevation: 397 m (1,302 ft)

Population (2018-01-01)
  - Total: 2,244
  - Density: 200.7/km^{2} (519.9/sq mi)
- Time zone: UTC+1 (CET)
  - Summer (DST): UTC+2 (CEST)
- Postal code: 4540
- Area code: 07258
- Vehicle registration: SE
- Website: www.pfarrkirchen-badhall.at

Pfarrkirchen bei Bad Hall is a municipality in the district of Steyr-Land in the Austrian state of Upper Austria.

== Geography ==
Pfarrkirchen lies in the Traunviertel. About 10 percent of the municipality is forest, and 77 percent is farmland.
