= Kleinreifling =

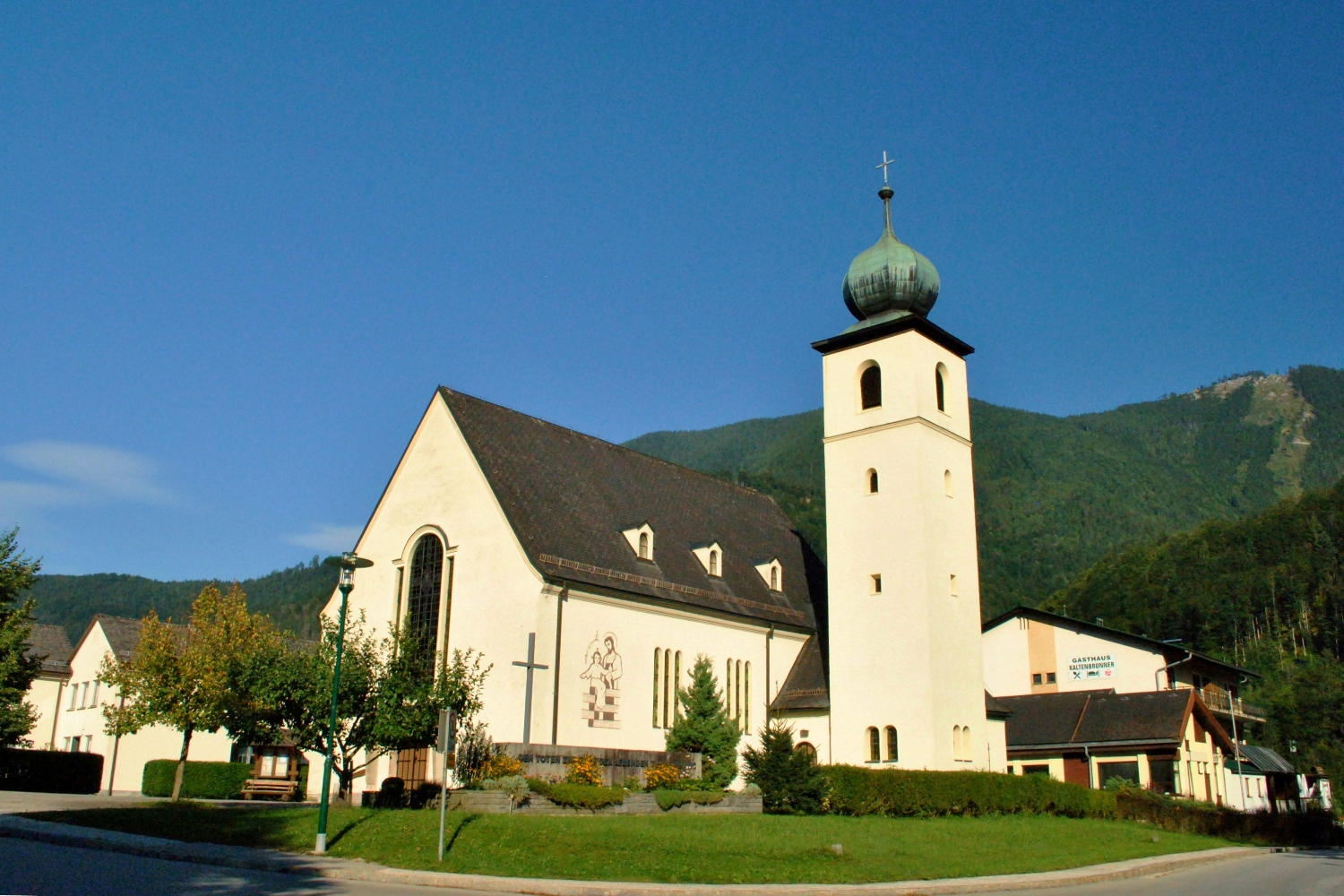

- Location within Austria
- Coordinates: 47°49′15″N 14°38′21″E
- Country: Austria
- State: Upper Austria
- District: Steyr-Land

Area
  - Total: 65.62 km^{2} (25.34 sq mi)
- Elevation: 417 m (1,368 ft)

Population
  - Total: 761
  - Density: 11.6/km^{2} (30.0/sq mi)
- Time zone: UTC+1 (CET)
  - Summer (DST): UTC+2 (CEST)
- Postal code: 3335, 4464, 8934
- Area code: (+43)7357

Kleinreifling is a village in the district of Steyr-Land in Upper Austria, Austria. It has a population of about 760 people. Kleinreifling is part of the municipality Weyer and is on the river Enns.

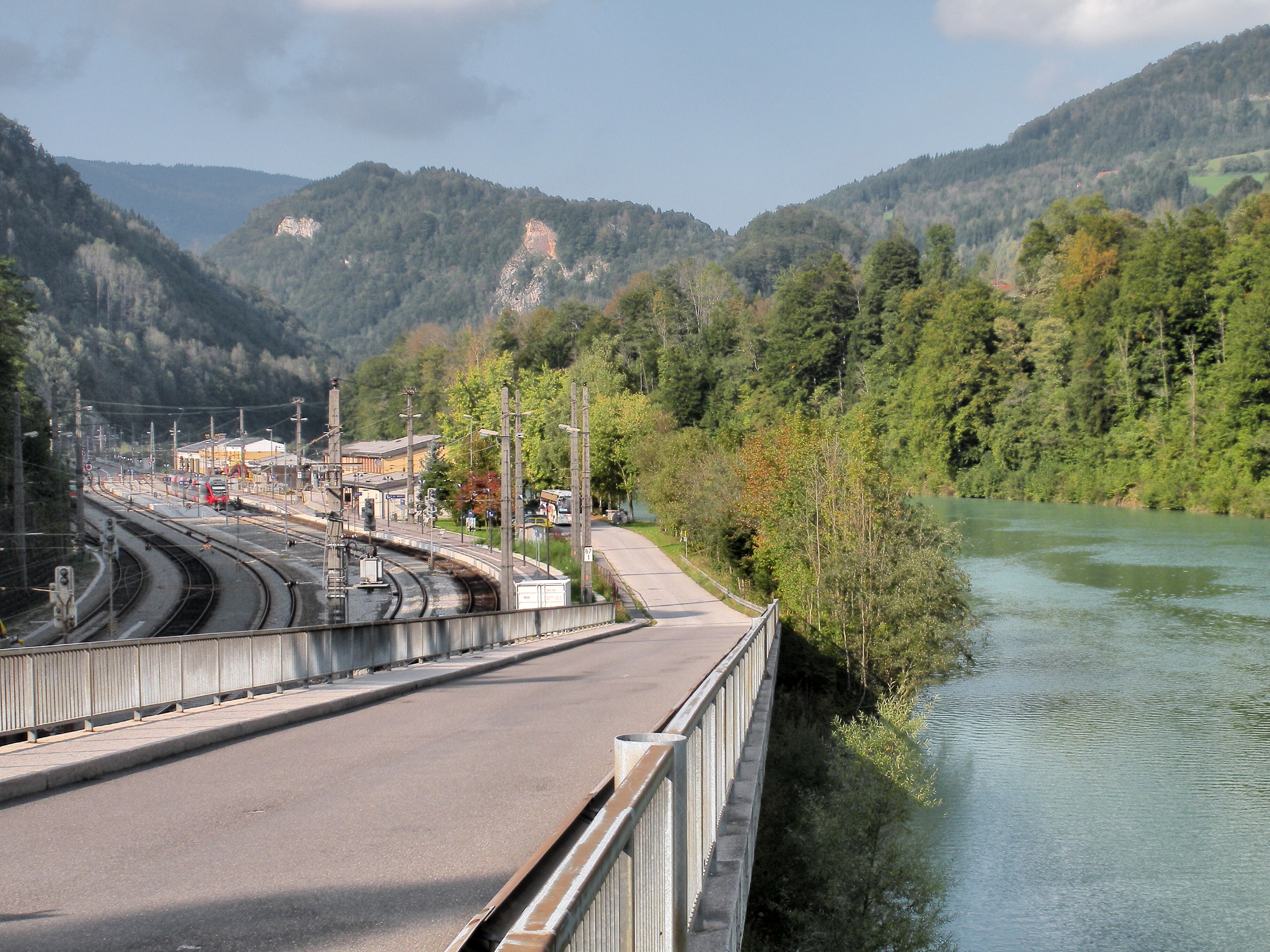
Kleinreifling, showing the station (on the left side) and the river Enns
