= Steyer =

Steyer may refer to:

- Steyer (name), people with the surname
- Steyer Opera House, a historic building in Decorah, Iowa, United States
- Steyer Bridge, a historic structure in Decorah, Iowa, United States
- Heinz-Steyer-Stadion, a football and athletics stadium in Dresden, Germany

== See also ==
- Steyr (disambiguation)
