= Rohr im Kremstal =

- Municipality
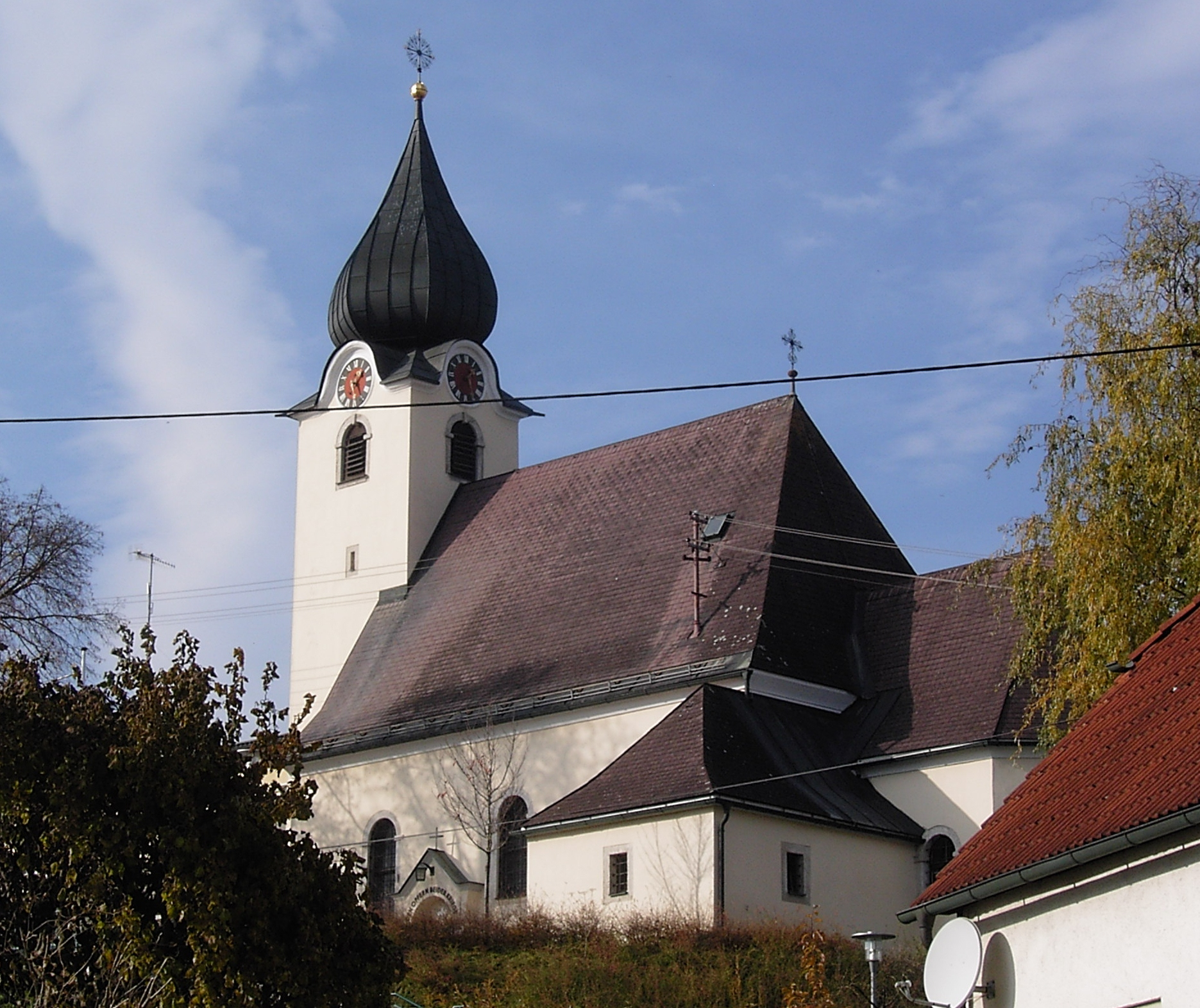

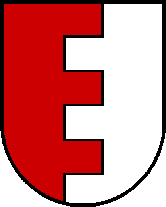
- Coat of arms

- Location within Austria
- Coordinates: 48°04′00″N 14°11′24″E
- Country: Austria
- State: Upper Austria
- District: Steyr-Land

Government
  - Mayor: Walter Ölsinger (ÖVP)

Area
  - Total: 13.61 km^{2} (5.25 sq mi)
- Elevation: 346 m (1,135 ft)

Population (2018-01-01)
  - Total: 1,374
  - Density: 101.0/km^{2} (261.5/sq mi)
- Time zone: UTC+1 (CET)
  - Summer (DST): UTC+2 (CEST)
- Postal code: 4532
- Area code: 07258
- Vehicle registration: SE
- Website: www.rohr.ooe.gv.at

Rohr im Kremstal is a municipality in the district of Steyr-Land in the Austrian state of Upper Austria.

== Geography ==
Rohr lies in the Traunviertel in the center of the fertile Krems valley, where the Sulzbach flows into the Krems river.

About 6 percent of the municipality is forest, and 83 percent is farmland.
