= Niederneukirchen =

- Municipality
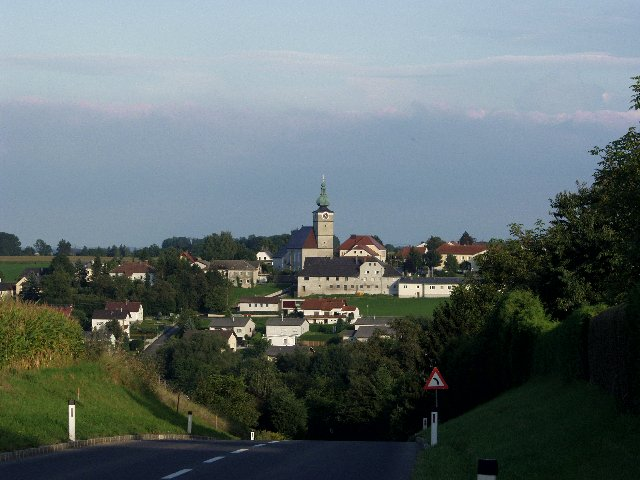

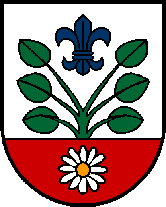
- Coat of arms

- Location within Austria
- Coordinates: 48°9′39″N 14°20′27″E
- Country: Austria
- State: Upper Austria
- District: Linz-Land

Government
  - Mayor: Ernestine Haginger (SPÖ)

Area
  - Total: 20.83 km^{2} (8.04 sq mi)
- Elevation: 336 m (1,102 ft)

Population (2018-01-01)
  - Total: 2,073
  - Density: 99.52/km^{2} (257.8/sq mi)
- Time zone: UTC+1 (CET)
  - Summer (DST): UTC+2 (CEST)
- Postal code: 4491
- Area code: 07224
- Vehicle registration: LL
- Website: www.niederneukirchen. ooe.gv.at

Niederneukirchen is a municipality in the district Linz-Land in the Austrian state of Upper Austria.

== Geography ==
Niederneukirchen lies about 25 km south of Linz. About 10 percent of the municipality is forest, and 80 percent is farmland.

== Population ==
Historical population
Year	Pop.	±%
1869	1,317	—
1880	1,315	−0.2%
1890	1,216	−7.5%
1900	1,259	+3.5%
1910	1,309	+4.0%
1923	1,190	−9.1%
1934	1,202	+1.0%
1939	1,187	−1.2%
1951	1,192	+0.4%
1961	1,077	−9.6%
1971	1,216	+12.9%
1981	1,440	+18.4%
1991	1,562	+8.5%
2001	1,780	+14.0%
2010	1,902	+6.9%
