= Adlwang =

- Municipality
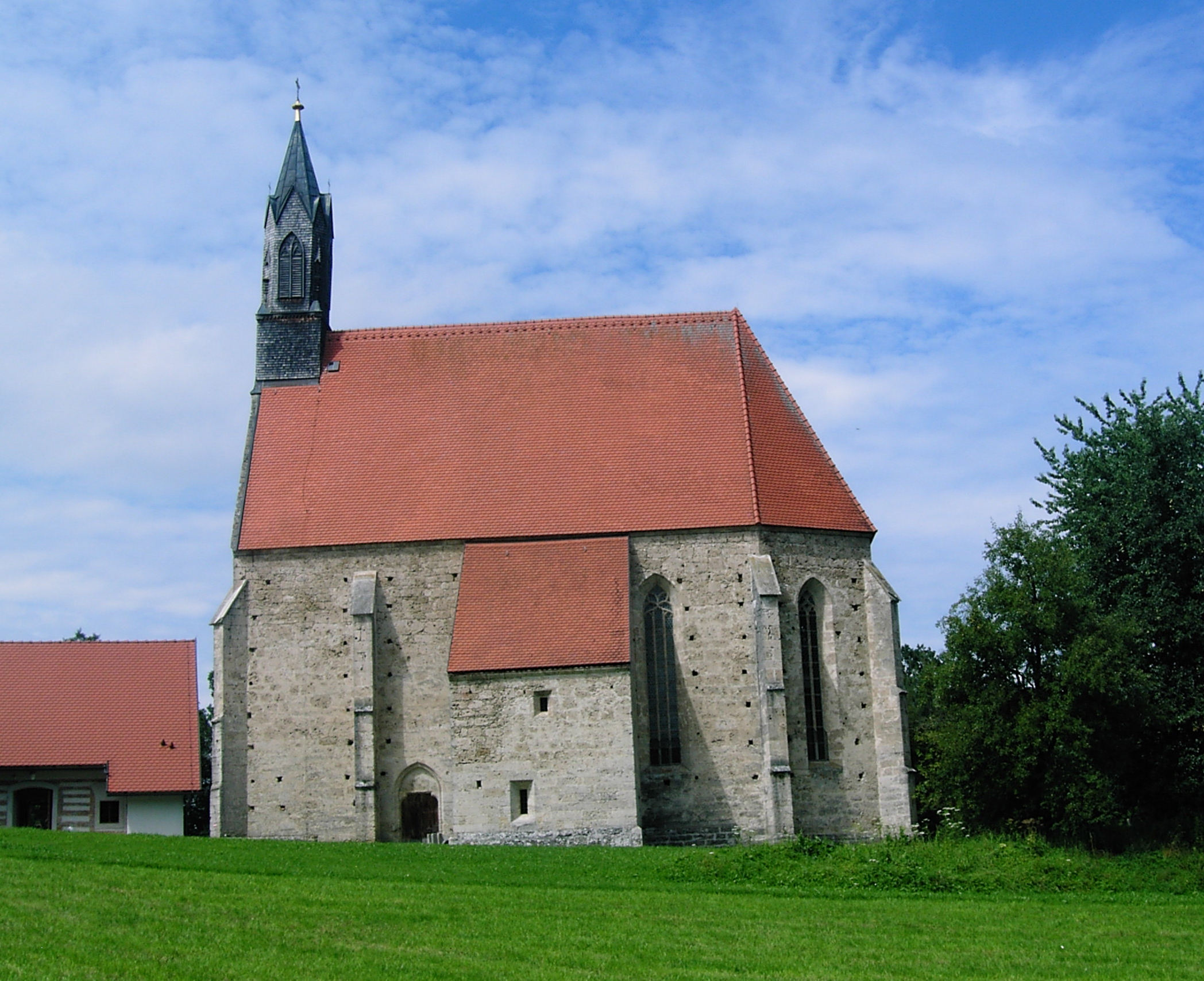

- Coat of arms

- Location within Austria
- Coordinates: 47°59′00″N 14°13′00″E
- Country: Austria
- State: Upper Austria
- District: Steyr-Land

Government
  - Mayor: Franz Hieslmayr (ÖVP)

Area
  - Total: 17.21 km^{2} (6.64 sq mi)
- Elevation: 422 m (1,385 ft)

Population (2018-01-01)
  - Total: 1,806
  - Density: 104.9/km^{2} (271.8/sq mi)
- Time zone: UTC+1 (CET)
  - Summer (DST): UTC+2 (CEST)
- Postal code: 4541
- Area code: +43 7258
- Vehicle registration: SE
- Website: www.adlwang.at

Adlwang is a municipality in the district of Steyr-Land in the Austrian state of Upper Austria.

== Geography ==
Adlwang lies south of Bad Hall and west of Steyr. About 16 percent of the municipality is forest, and 74 percent is farmland.
