= Celestine Church, Steyr =

Church in Steyr, Upper Austria

Coordinates: 48°02′24″N 14°25′06″E

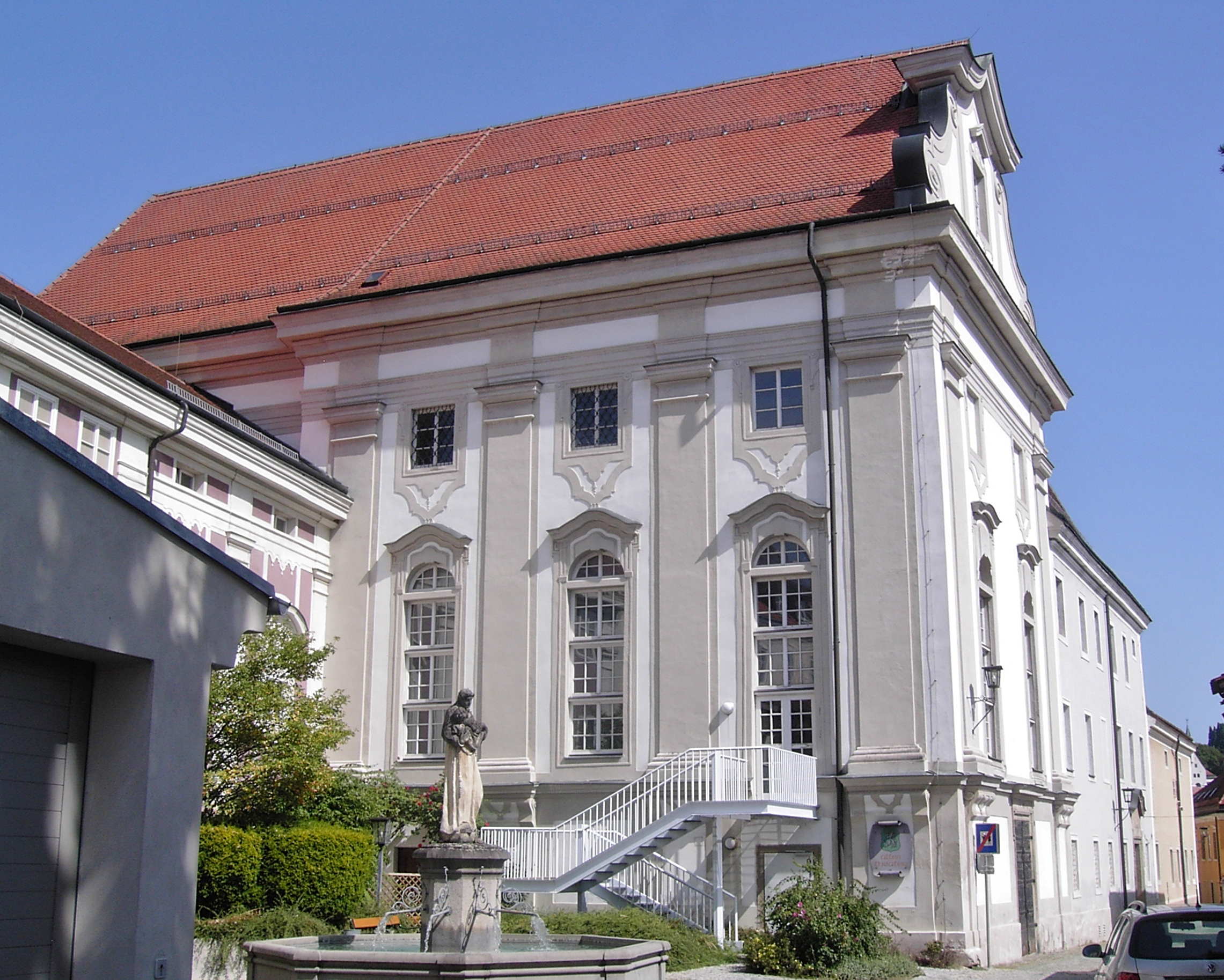
Former nunnery church in Steyr

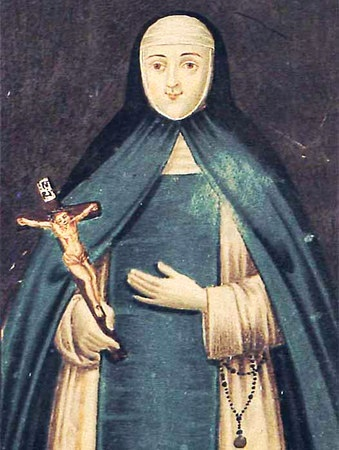
Celestine nun from Steyr, c.1780 (anonymous)

The Celestine Church, Steyr, also the Old Town Theatre (German: Cölestinerinnen-Kirche Steyr; Altes Stadttheater), is a former monastic church of the Celestine nuns in the town of Steyr in Upper Austria. The building, which is a protected historical monument, after conversion to a theatre in the 1790s, is now used as a music school and performance space.

== History ==
In 1646 a community of nuns of the Order of the Most Holy Annunciation, otherwise known as Celestine Nuns, after being driven by war from their original home in Pontarlier, Burgundy, came first to Vienna and then to Steyr, where the Empress Eleonora gave them a house. Other benefactors made possible the conversion of the site to conventual buildings in 1662 and the construction of the church between 1676 and 1681. After a fire in 1727 it was rebuilt in 1728. In 1784 the nunnery was dissolved under the Josephine reforms, and the municipal authority of Steyr acquired both the conventual buildings and the church. In 1789, with the stage fittings from the suppressed Garsten Abbey, efforts began to construct a theatre: the project was finally achieved in 1796 with financial support from Prince Lamberg. The building then became known as the Stadttheater, and after it was superseded in 1958, as the Altes Stadttheater (Old Town Theatre). The high altar from the former church, with Rococo statues and an altarpiece by Franz Xaver Gürtler (1777), was transferred in 1839 to Schiedlberg Parish Church.

== Architecture ==
The Baroque church, built without towers, has colossal Tuscan pilasters and Baroque window mouldings. The east front onto the Berggasse has a lavishly curved gable. In the former crypt is a mid-18th-century fresco of the Crucifixion by Johann Georg Morzer.
