= Dietach =

- Municipality
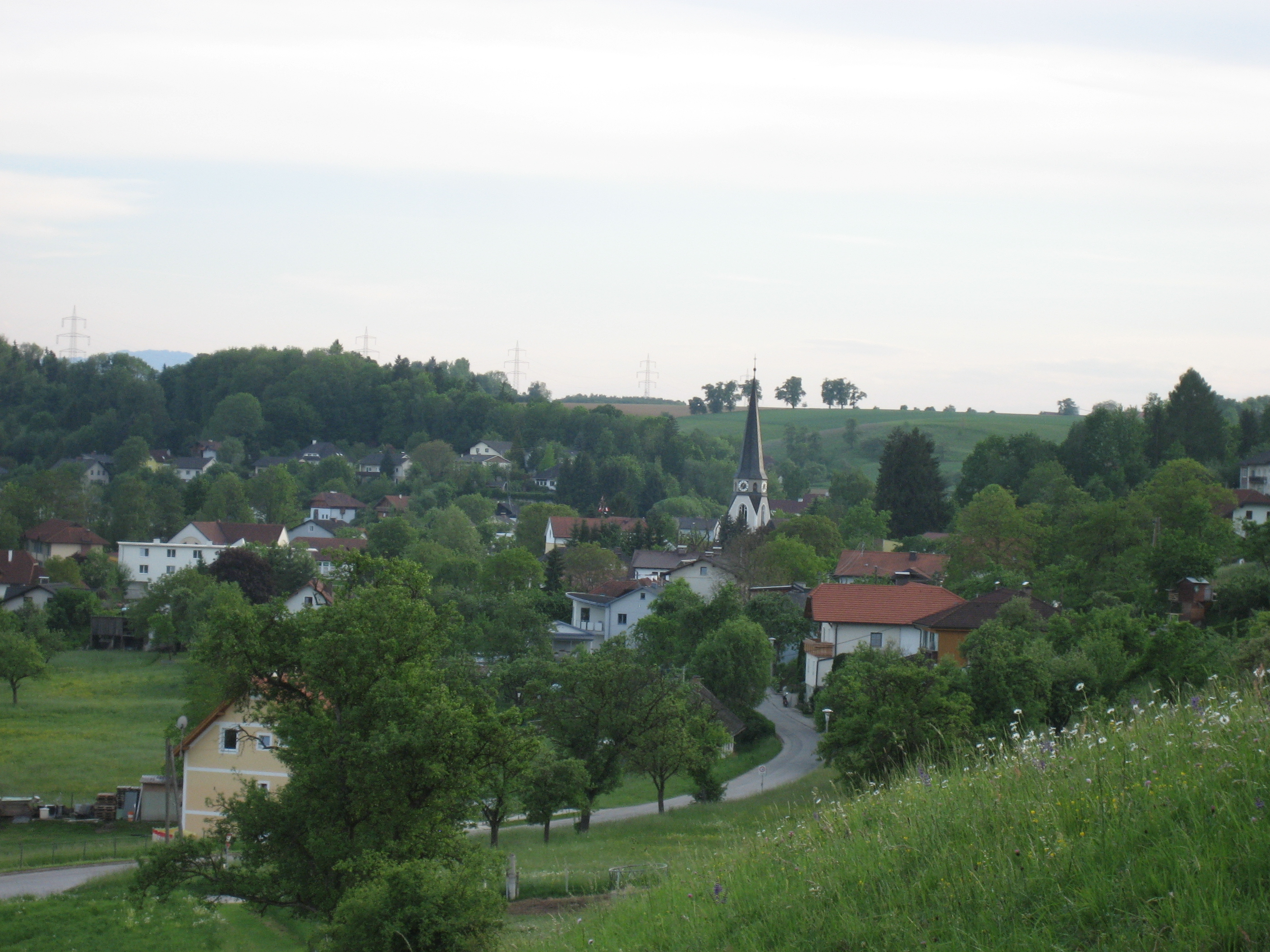

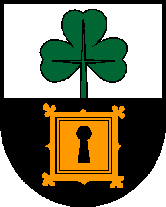
- Coat of arms

- Location within Austria
- Coordinates: 48°05′31″N 14°24′58″E
- Country: Austria
- State: Upper Austria
- District: Steyr-Land

Government
  - Mayor: Johannes Kampenhuber (ÖVP)

Area
  - Total: 20.64 km^{2} (7.97 sq mi)
- Elevation: 313 m (1,027 ft)

Population (2018-01-01)
  - Total: 3,212
  - Density: 155.6/km^{2} (403.1/sq mi)
- Time zone: UTC+1 (CET)
  - Summer (DST): UTC+2 (CEST)
- Postal code: 4407
- Area code: 07252
- Vehicle registration: SE
- Website: www.dietach.at

Dietach is a municipality in the district of Steyr-Land in the Austrian state of Upper Austria.

== Geography ==
About 17 percent of the municipality is forest, and 72 percent is farmland.
