= Losenstein =

- Municipality
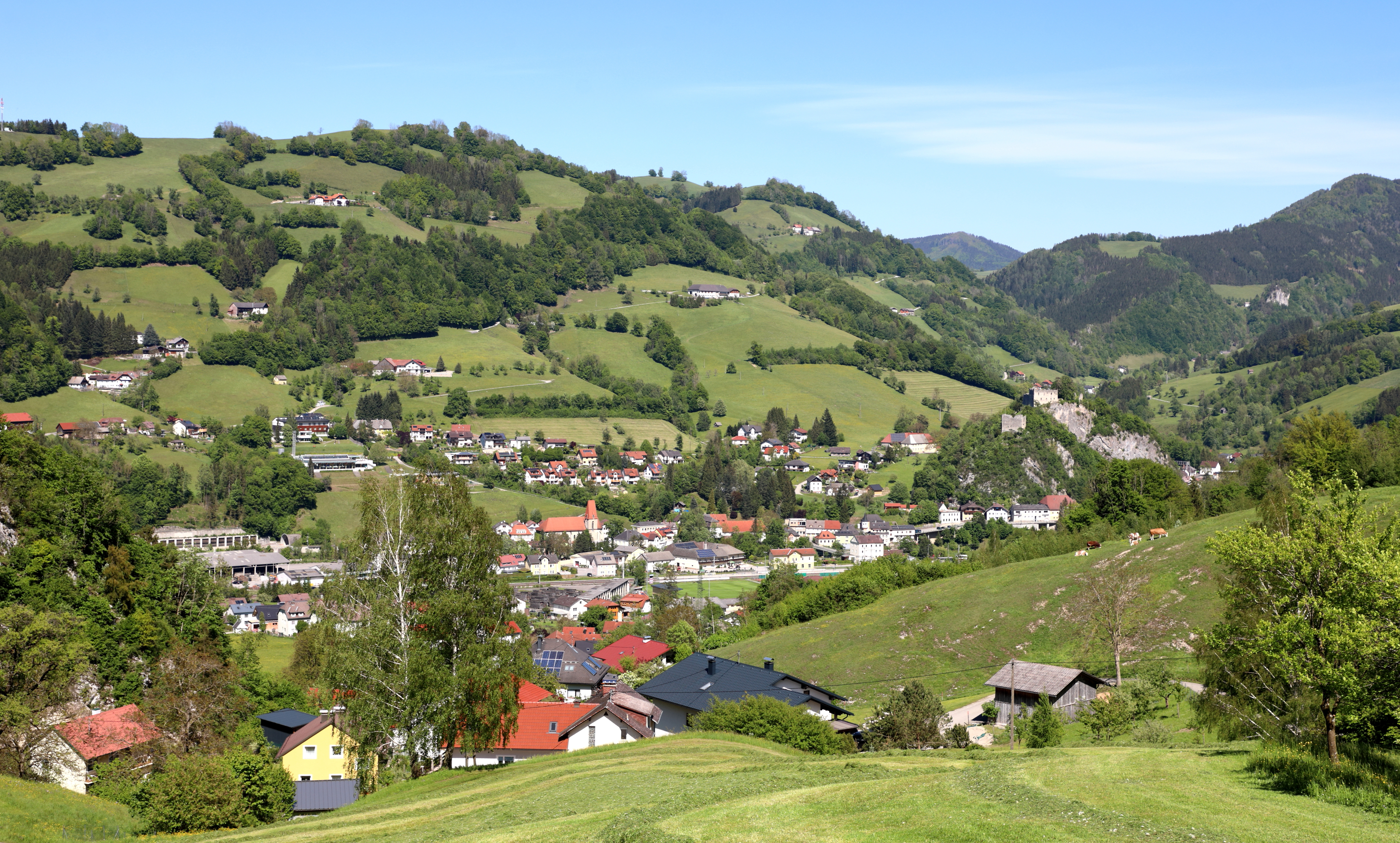
- Southwest view of Losenstein

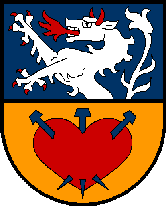
- Coat of arms

- Location within Austria
- Coordinates: 47°55′31″N 14°26′00″E
- Country: Austria
- State: Upper Austria
- District: Steyr-Land

Government
  - Mayor: Karl Zeilermayr (ÖVP)

Area
  - Total: 19.41 km^{2} (7.49 sq mi)
- Elevation: 348 m (1,142 ft)

Population (2018-01-01)
  - Total: 1,604
  - Density: 82.64/km^{2} (214.0/sq mi)
- Time zone: UTC+1 (CET)
  - Summer (DST): UTC+2 (CEST)
- Postal code: 4460
- Area code: 07255
- Vehicle registration: SE
- Website: www.losenstein. ooe.gv.at

Losenstein is a small village in the south of Upper Austria, Austria. About 1,700 inhabitants call Losenstein their home. It lies in the southernmost quarter of Upper Austria called "Traunviertel". Its spatial dimension from North to South is 8,1 km, from West to East 4,5 km. 45,9% of its area are covered by forests, another 39,7% are used for agricultural purposes. The closest city of administrative importance is Steyr, which is 20 km to North. It can be accessed via the "B-109 Eisenbundesstrasse" or by train.

Losenstein is the birthplace of the famous dialect poet Anton Schosser (1801–1849). One of his most known songs is the Erzherzog-Johann-Jodler "Wo i geh und steh".

The village is sometimes referred to as the gem of the Enns-valley ("Die Perle des Ennstales"). The river Enns divides the village and can be crossed on a bridge, connecting the village centre with the residential areas. The highest mountain is called "Schieferstein" and is located in the south-east of the village.

== Ruins of Losenstein ==
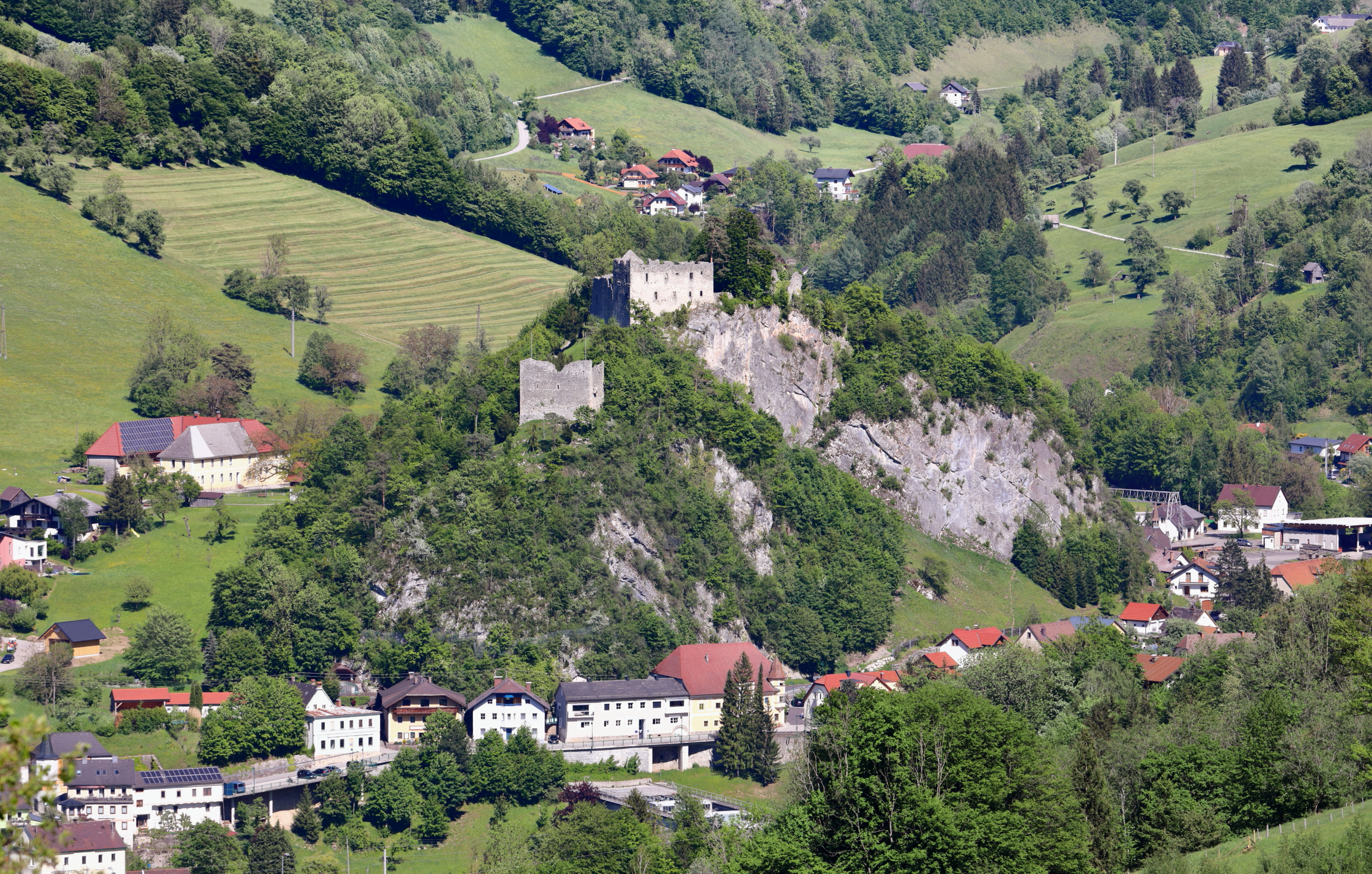
castle of Losenstein

The ruins of the former castle of Losenstein originate in the 12th century. They used to be one of the biggest and oldest castles of Upper Austria. The rock on which the ruins sit lies at the very core of the village center.

The former ski resort "Hohe Dirn", which is located at the border of Losenstein and "Reichraming" at the south-west of the village, is easily accessible by a well-maintained road (10min from the village centre). It is well known for its variety of leisure activities in the summer and winter.

The recent development policies were focused on attracting highly-technical industrial and chemical firms, providing sophisticated job opportunities for inhabitants and commuters from nearby villages.
