= Waldneukirchen =

- Municipality
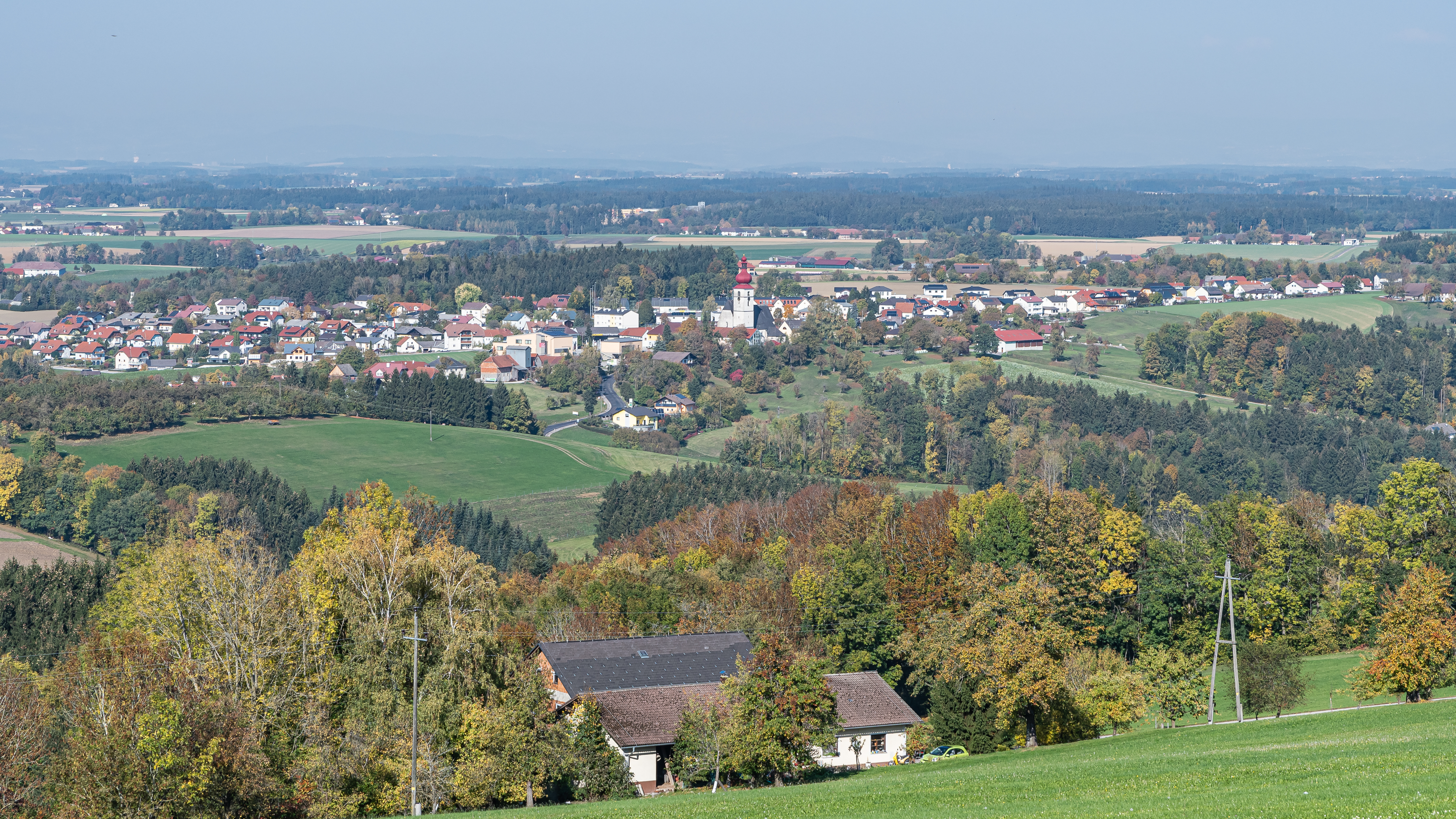

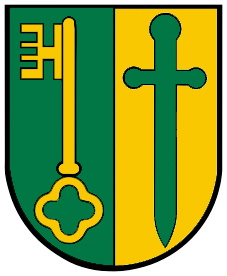
- Coat of arms

- Location within Austria
- Coordinates: 47°59′49″N 14°15′41″E
- Country: Austria
- State: Upper Austria
- District: Steyr-Land

Government
  - Mayor: Karl Schneckenleitner (ÖVP)

Area
  - Total: 26.52 km^{2} (10.24 sq mi)
- Elevation: 446 m (1,463 ft)

Population (2018-01-01)
  - Total: 2,242
  - Density: 84.54/km^{2} (219.0/sq mi)
- Time zone: UTC+1 (CET)
  - Summer (DST): UTC+2 (CEST)
- Postal code: 4595
- Area code: 07258
- Vehicle registration: SE
- Website: www.waldneukirchen.at

Waldneukirchen is a municipality in the district of Steyr-Land in the Austrian state of Upper Austria.

== Geography ==
The extension of Waldneukirchen is 5.5 km from north to south and 8.5 km from west to east. 14.8% of the area is forested, 74.2% is used for agriculture (for comparison: this value is 41% in the political district of Steyr-Land).

The municipality extends from the Molasse area of the Alpine foothills to the Steyrtal. The place is also called "The Gate to the Steyrtal". The sediments of the Flysch Zone are on the one hand deposits of a sea from the Upper Cretaceous, on the other hand Marl and sandstone sediments from the Old Tertiary. The landscape here in Waldneukirchen was decisively shaped in the Quaternary, namely in the Ice Ages. In the cold periods of the Günz-, Mindel-, and Rissis Age, the Krems glacier, coming from the south, pushed with its huge glacier tongue far into the Alpine foothills and stored in the municipality of Waldneukirchen abounds in massive moraine trees made of gravel, sand and clay. The glacier brooks that emerged from the ice, forerunners of the Steyr, built up bulkheads in the ice-free area during the cold times. During the warm periods, some of these gravel deposits are then removed through the cutting channels. Large parts of the northern plateau of the municipality belong to this gravel area of the elevated terrace above the Steyr river, up to which the municipality extends in the south- At the time of the most recent glaciation (Würm), silt-rich cover layers were blown up in all ice-free (periglacial) parts of the plateau northwest of the Steyr. Today they represent the covering clay. The rainwater is not diverted into the depths, but flows mostly in the municipality to the north via Fernbach, Binderbach into the Krems. In this way, the erosion has shaped the moat landscape so characteristic of the flysch. The agricultural soils in the municipality of Waldneukirchen consist - according to the explanations of the soil map 1: 25000 - in their A-Horizont s mainly of loamy silt, are medium humus and lime-free, and clearly crumbly, the B-Horizont e are mostly loamy silt or sandy loam, which is usually free of lime. Below that, from a depth of approx. 50 cm, lies the horizon with lime-free, loamy silt.

=== Municipal organization ===
The municipal area comprises the following seven localities:

- Eggmair
- Furtberg
- Großmengersdorf
- Pesendorf
- Sankt Nikola
- Steinersdorf
- Waldneukirchen

=== Population development ===
In 2001 the community had 2254 inhabitants according to the census, in 2019 a little less: 2194. The population development since the 1st VZ 1869 (1732 Ew. Then, since then the population has been slowly increasing) and other socio-economic parameters for the community can be found in The Statistics.at sample census in 2006 revealed 1104 persons in employment (employment rate of 51.3%); after the position in the job only 14% in agriculture and forestry, 25.7% in the production of goods. In 2017 the number of people employed in agriculture and forestry decreased to 8.2% (= 100 people)
