= Oftering =

- Municipality
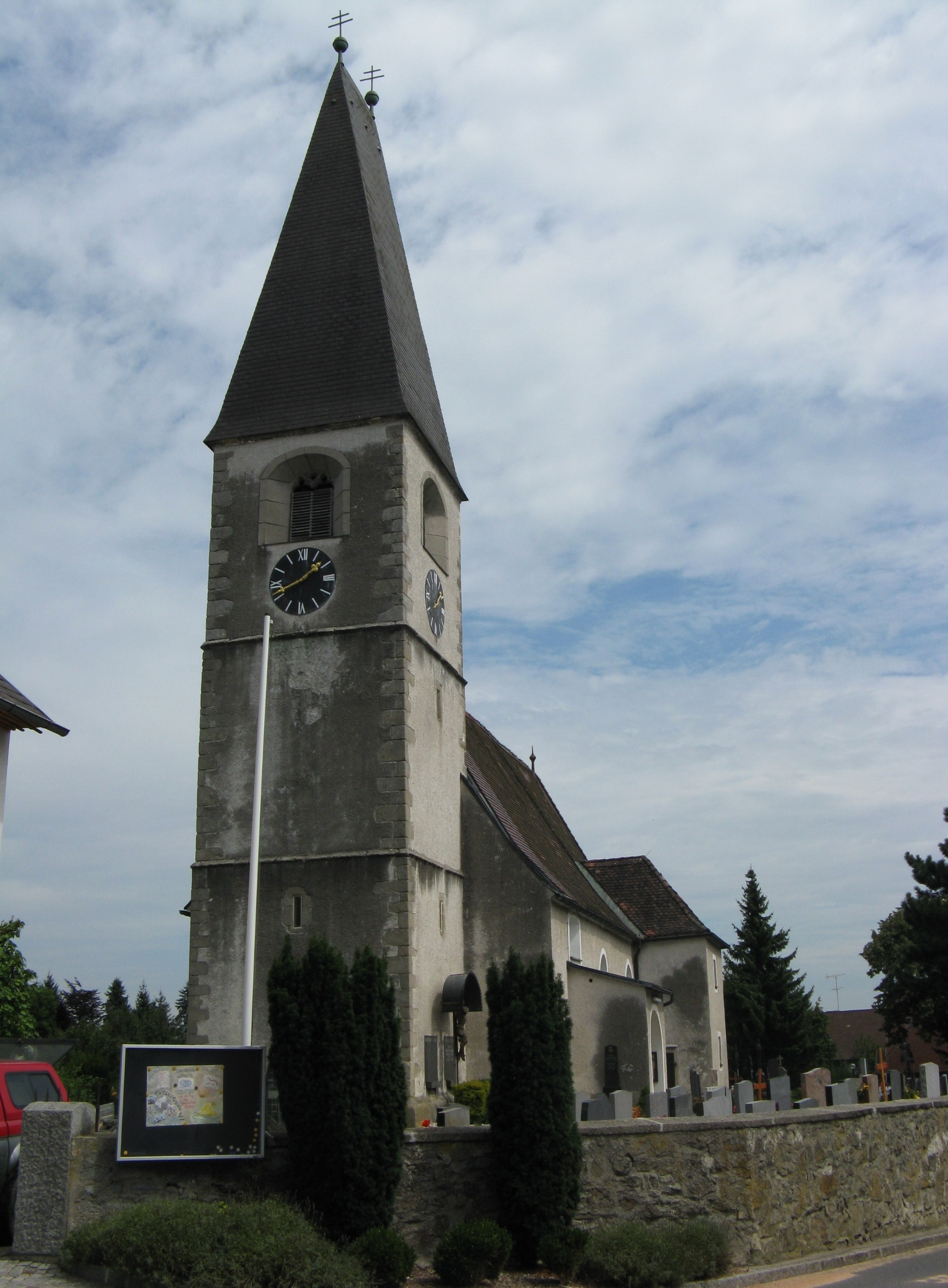

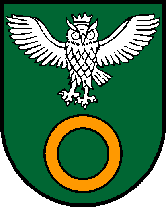
- Coat of arms

- Location within Austria
- Coordinates: 48°14′1″N 14°8′0″E
- Country: Austria
- State: Upper Austria
- District: Linz-Land

Government
  - Mayor: Angerlehner Margit (ÖVP)

Area
  - Total: 13.5 km^{2} (5.2 sq mi)
- Elevation: 316 m (1,037 ft)

Population (2018-01-01)
  - Total: 2,076
  - Density: 154/km^{2} (398/sq mi)
- Time zone: UTC+1 (CET)
  - Summer (DST): UTC+2 (CEST)
- Postal code: 4064
- Area code: 07221
- Vehicle registration: LL
- Website: www.oftering.at

Oftering is a municipality in the district Linz-Land in the Austrian state of Upper Austria.

== Population ==
Historical population
Year	Pop.	±%
1869	1,196	—
1880	1,107	−7.4%
1890	1,184	+7.0%
1900	1,147	−3.1%
1910	1,163	+1.4%
1923	1,207	+3.8%
1934	1,214	+0.6%
1939	1,262	+4.0%
1951	1,346	+6.7%
1961	1,378	+2.4%
1971	1,532	+11.2%
1981	1,618	+5.6%
1991	1,628	+0.6%
2001	1,824	+12.0%
2011	1,968	+7.9%
