= Losenstein Castle =

Castle in Losenstein, Austria

Burg Losenstein
- Losenstein
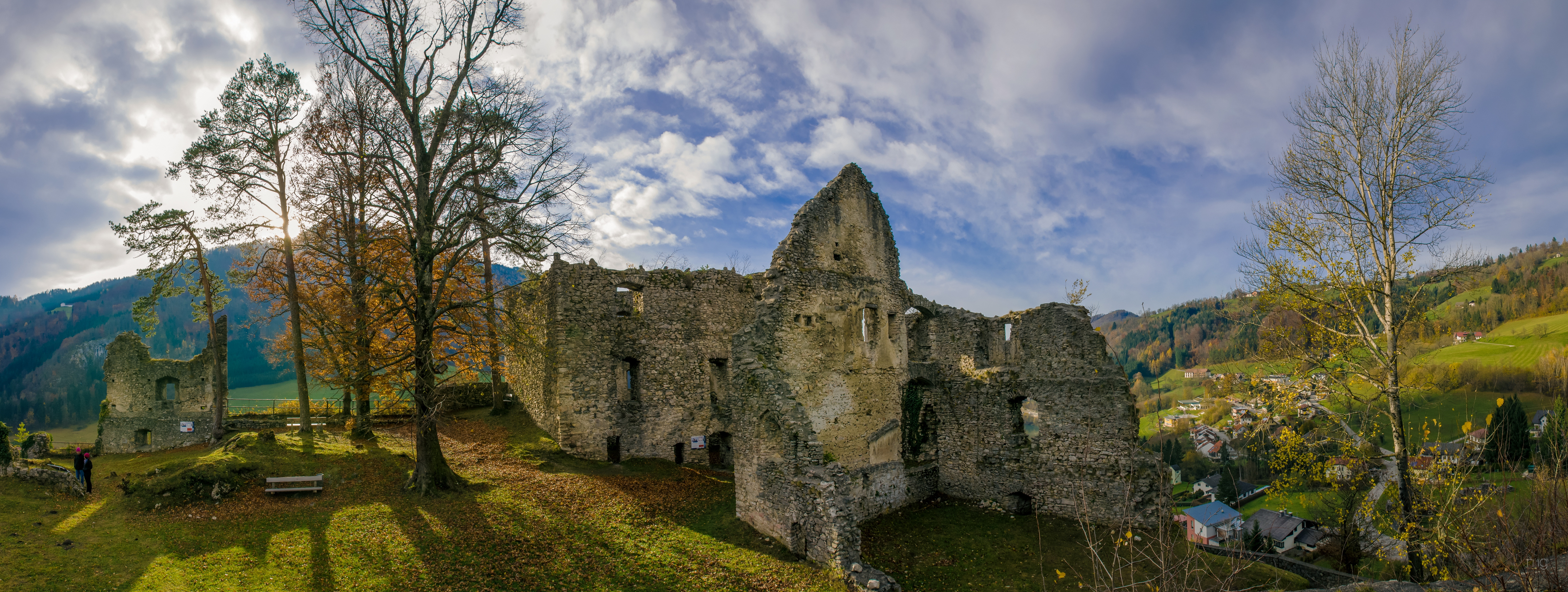
- Interior view of Losenstein Castle

Site information
- Type: hill castle
- Code: AT-4
- Condition: Ruin

Location
- Coordinates: 47°55′26.36″N 14°26′15.55″E

Site history
- Built: 12th century

Losenstein Castle or Burg Losenstein is a castle ruin in Upper Austria. It rises above the village of Losenstein on a 60-metre (200 ft) rock (Castle Rock), composed of dolomite. It is one of the largest and oldest ruins of Upper Austria. Built in the 12th century by the Styrian Ottokars, the castle consists of the main building and one major ancillary tower. Beginning in 1252 the Lords of Losenstein (Losenstein) owned the castle.

The castle offers views of the village of Losenstein, the river Enns, and the foothills in the direction of Styria. The castle ruins are freely accessible.

The original structure of the castle is still visible. Exterior walls, gothic windows and large arches are still visible. The individual areas such as church, living area, patio and economic activity are precisely delineated.

== History ==
The Styrian Ottakars built this castle around 1150 to protect themselves from invading troops in the Steiermark. In 1170 the castle was first documented. In 1252 it passed to Dietmar of Steyr, who received it from King Ottokar II of Bohemia in exchange for the city of Steyr. From that point on, the family of Dietmar and his descendants were known as the Lords of Losenstein and owned the castle continuously until their extinction in 1692. The graves of the family of Losenstein are located in Garsten Abbey (Losenstein Chapel). After that the line passed by inheritance to the family of von Auersperg, who eventually sold the castle in 1905 to the province of Upper Austria.

== Current use ==
The ruins of Losenstein Castle have served on several occasions as a venue for plays. The castle theatre group of Losenstein has made use of the location on multiple occasions. It is a common place for historic tours by school groups and history buffs, and home more recently to the castle rock climbing area. The preservation of the historic building and the maintenance of the possibility for a variety of activities in this unique cultural treasure has been given highest priority. Signage allows interested visitors to understand the historical and cultural significance of the ruins of Burg Losenstein.
