= Stayer (disambiguation) =

A stayer is a horse that may be a better performer when racing over a longer distance.

Stayer or The Stayer may also refer to:

- Canyon News (Texas) or The Stayer, a newspaper founded in 1896
- Stayer, a cyclist in motor-paced racing
- Stayer (TV series) (2024), a Norwegian television drama series
- "The Stayer", a 2007 song by Mark Seymour from Westgate

== People with the surname Stayer or Stayers ==
- James M. Stayer (1935–2025), Canadian historian
- Charlie Stayers (1937–2005), West Indian cricketer
