= Steyer (name) =

Steyer is a German-language surname. Notable individuals with the surname include:

- Christian Steyer (born 1946), German actor and musician
- Ernst Steyer (1842–1900), German politician
- Heinrich Steyer (1834–1887), German politician
- Heinz Steyer (1909–1944), German footballer
  - Heinz-Steyer-Stadion, a football and athletics stadium in Dresden
- Jim Steyer (born 1956), American child advocate
- Joachim Steyer (born 1966), German politician
- Matěj Václav Šteyer (1630–1692), Czech Jesuit, preacher, educator, translator and author
- Philipp Steyer (1839–1907), German landowner and politician
- Tom Steyer (born 1957), American asset manager, philanthropist and environmentalist
- Włodzimierz Steyer (1892–1957), Polish naval officer

== See also ==
- Steyr
- Steyrer
- Steer (surname)
