= Linz-Land District =

Coordinates: 48.208°N 14.240°E

Linz-Land District Bezirk Linz-Land
- District
- Country: Austria
- State: Upper Austria
- Number of municipalities: 22
- Administrative seat: Linz

Government
  - District Governor: Manfred Hageneder

Area
  - Total: 460.3 km^{2} (177.7 sq mi)

Population (2011)
  - Total: 138,721
  - Density: 301.4/km^{2} (780.5/sq mi)
- Time zone: UTC+01:00 (CET)
  - Summer (DST): UTC+02:00 (CEST)
- Vehicle registration: LL

Bezirk Linz-Land is a district of Upper Austria in Austria.

== Municipalities ==
Towns (Städte) are indicated in boldface; market towns (Marktgemeinden) in italics; suburbs, hamlets and other subdivisions of a municipality are indicated in small characters.

- Allhaming
- **Ansfelden**
- Asten
- Eggendorf im Traunkreis
- **Enns**
- Hargelsberg
- Hofkirchen im Traunkreis
- Hörsching
- Kematen an der Krems
- Kirchberg-Thening
- Kronstorf
- **Leonding**
- Neuhofen an der Krems
- Niederneukirchen
- Oftering
- Pasching
- Piberbach
- Pucking
- Sankt Florian
- Sankt Marien
- **Traun**
- Wilhering
