= Kematen an der Krems =

- Municipality
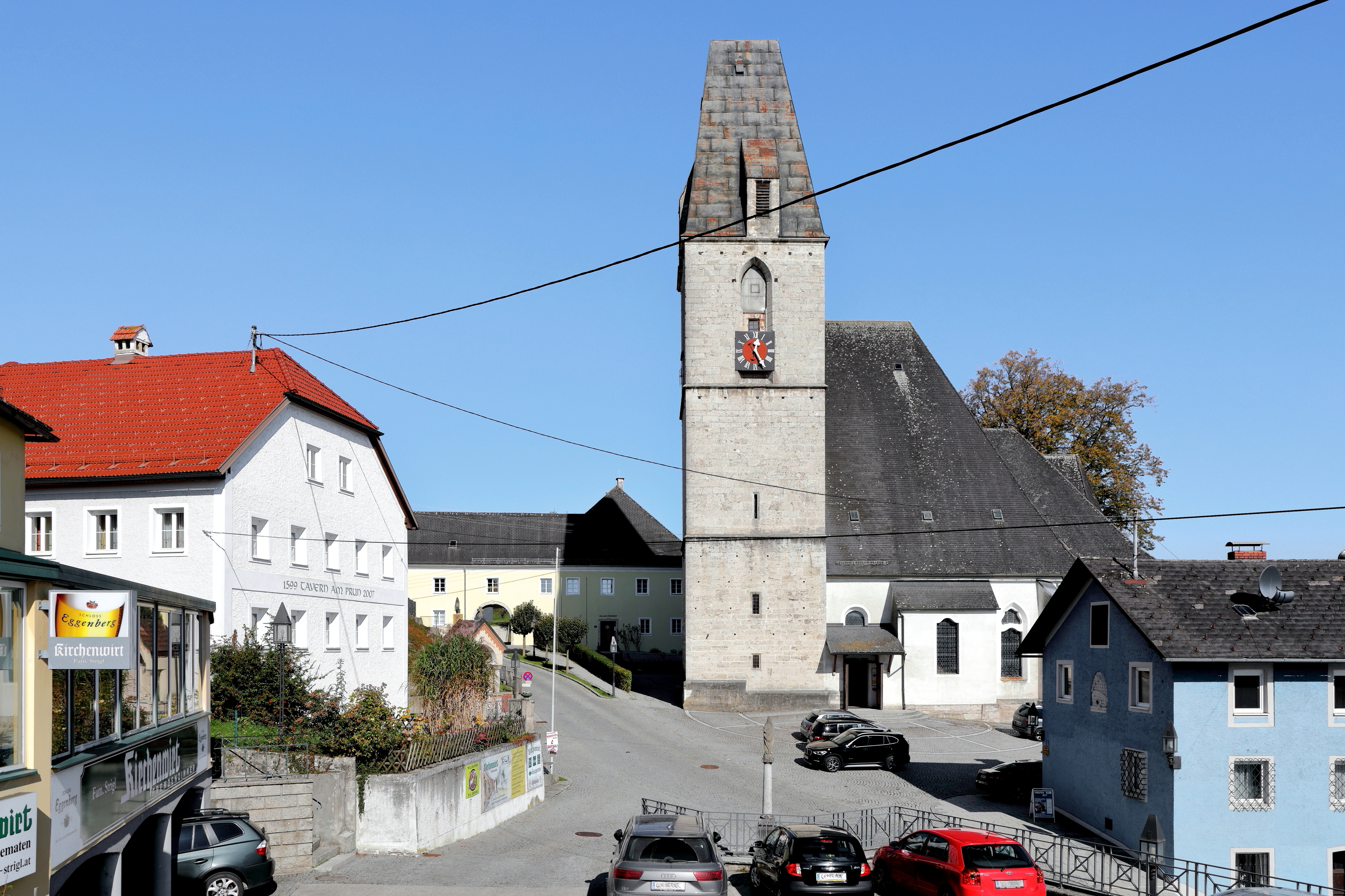
- Church of Saint Martin

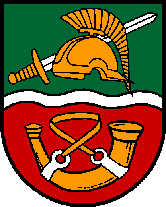
- Coat of arms

- Location within Austria
- Coordinates: 48°6′41″N 14°11′32″E
- Country: Austria
- State: Upper Austria
- District: Linz-Land

Government
  - Mayor: Markus Stadlbauer (ÖVP)

Area
  - Total: 21.54 km^{2} (8.32 sq mi)
- Elevation: 327 m (1,073 ft)

Population (2018-01-01)
  - Total: 2,790
  - Density: 130/km^{2} (335/sq mi)
- Time zone: UTC+1 (CET)
  - Summer (DST): UTC+2 (CEST)
- Postal code: 4531
- Area code: 07228
- Vehicle registration: LL
- Website: www.kematen.at

Kematen an der Krems is a municipality in the district Linz-Land in the Austrian state of Upper Austria.

== Population ==
Historical population
Year	Pop.	±%
1869	1,539	—
1880	1,608	+4.5%
1890	1,586	−1.4%
1900	1,585	−0.1%
1910	1,620	+2.2%
1923	1,665	+2.8%
1934	1,738	+4.4%
1939	1,652	−4.9%
1951	1,742	+5.4%
1961	1,618	−7.1%
1971	1,679	+3.8%
1981	1,783	+6.2%
1991	1,883	+5.6%
2001	2,225	+18.2%
2011	2,510	+12.8%
