= Garsten =

- Municipality
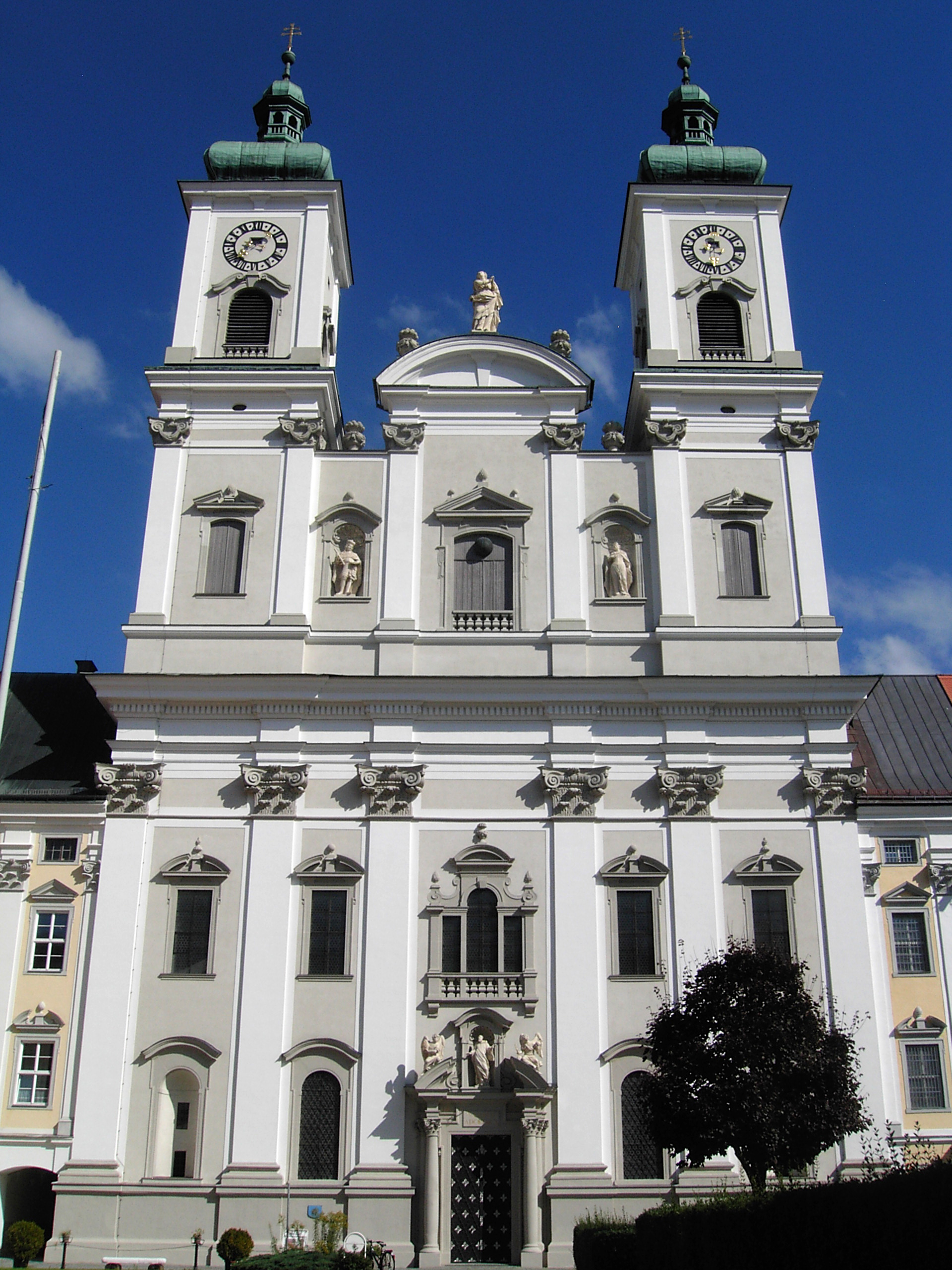

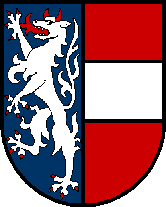
- Coat of arms

- Location within Austria
- Coordinates: 48°01′18″N 14°24′32″E
- Country: Austria
- State: Upper Austria
- District: Steyr-Land

Government
  - Mayor: Anton Silber (ÖVP)

Area
  - Total: 53.21 km^{2} (20.54 sq mi)
- Elevation: 298 m (978 ft)

Population (2018-01-01)
  - Total: 6,711
  - Density: 126.1/km^{2} (326.7/sq mi)
- Time zone: UTC+1 (CET)
  - Summer (DST): UTC+2 (CEST)
- Postal code: 4451
- Area code: 07252
- Vehicle registration: SE
- Website: www.garsten.ooe.gv.at

Garsten is a municipality in the district of Steyr-Land in the Austrian state of Upper Austria.

== History ==
Garsten was first mentioned as Garstina in documentation around 990, and a monastery was founded there in 1082. After being fully rebuilt in Baroque style in the late 17th century, the Benedictine monastery was converted to a prison in 1850, a function it fulfills to this day.
