= Piberbach =

- Municipality
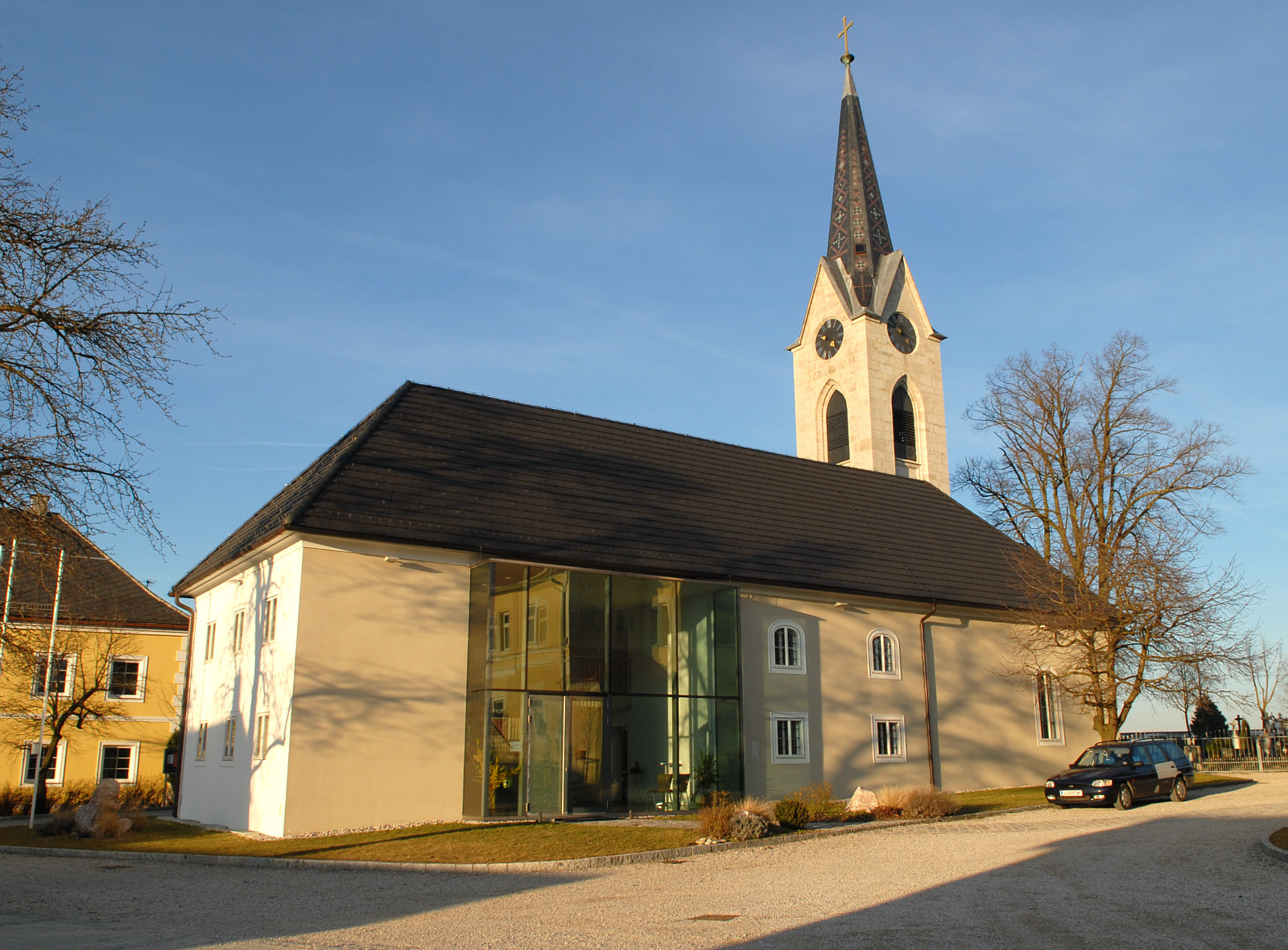

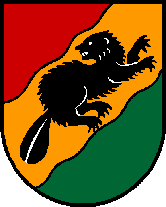
- Coat of arms

- Location within Austria
- Coordinates: 48°6′55″N 14°13′36″E
- Country: Austria
- State: Upper Austria
- District: Linz-Land

Government
  - Mayor: Florian Kranawetter (ÖVP)

Area
  - Total: 17.35 km^{2} (6.70 sq mi)
- Elevation: 320 m (1,050 ft)

Population (2018-01-01)
  - Total: 1,902
  - Density: 109.6/km^{2} (283.9/sq mi)
- Time zone: UTC+1 (CET)
  - Summer (DST): UTC+2 (CEST)
- Postal code: 4533
- Area code: 07228
- Vehicle registration: LL
- Website: piberbach.ooe.gv.at

Piberbach is a municipality in the district Linz-Land in the Austrian state of Upper Austria.

== Population ==
Historical population
Year	Pop.	±%
1869	928	—
1880	978	+5.4%
1890	908	−7.2%
1900	891	−1.9%
1910	987	+10.8%
1923	1,036	+5.0%
1934	1,007	−2.8%
1939	964	−4.3%
1951	1,128	+17.0%
1961	1,153	+2.2%
1971	1,376	+19.3%
1981	1,411	+2.5%
1991	1,511	+7.1%
2001	1,705	+12.8%
2011	1,845	+8.2%
