= Sankt Marien =

- Municipality
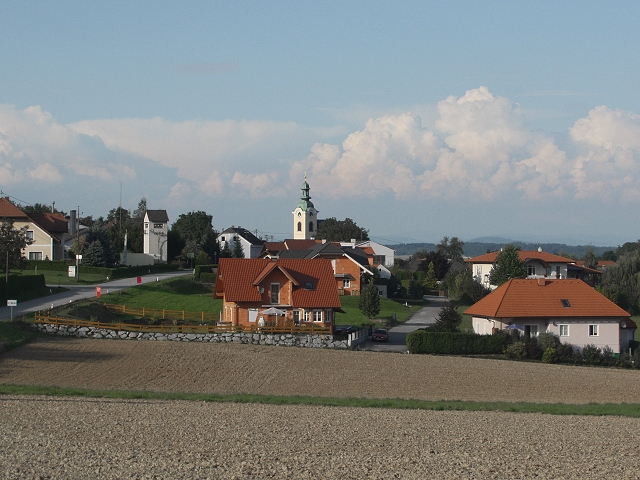

- Coat of arms

- Location within Austria
- Coordinates: 48°8′47″N 14°16′32″E
- Country: Austria
- State: Upper Austria
- District: Linz-Land

Government
  - Mayor: Walter Lazelsberger (ÖVP)

Area
  - Total: 37.65 km^{2} (14.54 sq mi)
- Elevation: 338 m (1,109 ft)

Population (2018-01-01)
  - Total: 4,769
  - Density: 126.7/km^{2} (328.1/sq mi)
- Time zone: UTC+1 (CET)
  - Summer (DST): UTC+2 (CEST)
- Postal code: 4502
- Area code: 07227
- Vehicle registration: LL
- Website: www.st-marien.ooe.gv.at

Sankt Marien is a municipality in the district Linz-Land in the Austrian state of Upper Austria with 5,124 inhabitants.

== Population ==
Historical population
Year	Pop.	±%
1869	2,250	—
1880	2,218	−1.4%
1890	2,235	+0.8%
1900	2,266	+1.4%
1910	2,407	+6.2%
1923	2,432	+1.0%
1934	2,469	+1.5%
1939	2,264	−8.3%
1951	2,451	+8.3%
1961	2,388	−2.6%
1971	2,488	+4.2%
1981	2,793	+12.3%
1991	3,360	+20.3%
2001	4,140	+23.2%
2011	4,619	+11.6%
