= Steyr-Land District =

Coordinates: 48.014°N 14.409°E

Steyr-Land District Bezirk Steyr-Land
- District
- Country: Austria
- State: Upper Austria
- Number of municipalities: 21
- Administrative seat: Steyr

Government
  - District Governor: Barbara Spöck

Area
  - Total: 971.7 km^{2} (375.2 sq mi)

Population (2001)
  - Total: 57,611
  - Density: 59.29/km^{2} (153.6/sq mi)
- Time zone: UTC+01:00 (CET)
  - Summer (DST): UTC+02:00 (CEST)
- Vehicle registration: SE

Bezirk Steyr-Land is a district of the state of Upper Austria in Austria. Its administrative capital is Steyr, which lies outside the district itself.

== Municipalities ==
Towns (Städte) are indicated in boldface; market towns (Marktgemeinden) in italics; suburbs, hamlets and other subdivisions of a municipality are indicated in small characters.

- Adlwang
- Aschach an der Steyr
- Bad Hall
- Dietach
- Gaflenz
- Garsten
- Großraming
- Laussa
- Losenstein
- Maria Neustift
- Pfarrkirchen bei Bad Hall
- Reichraming
- Rohr im Kremstal
- Schiedlberg
- Sierning
- Sankt Ulrich bei Steyr
- Ternberg
- Waldneukirchen
- Weyer
- Wolfern

== See also ==
- Styria
