= Sierning =

- Municipality
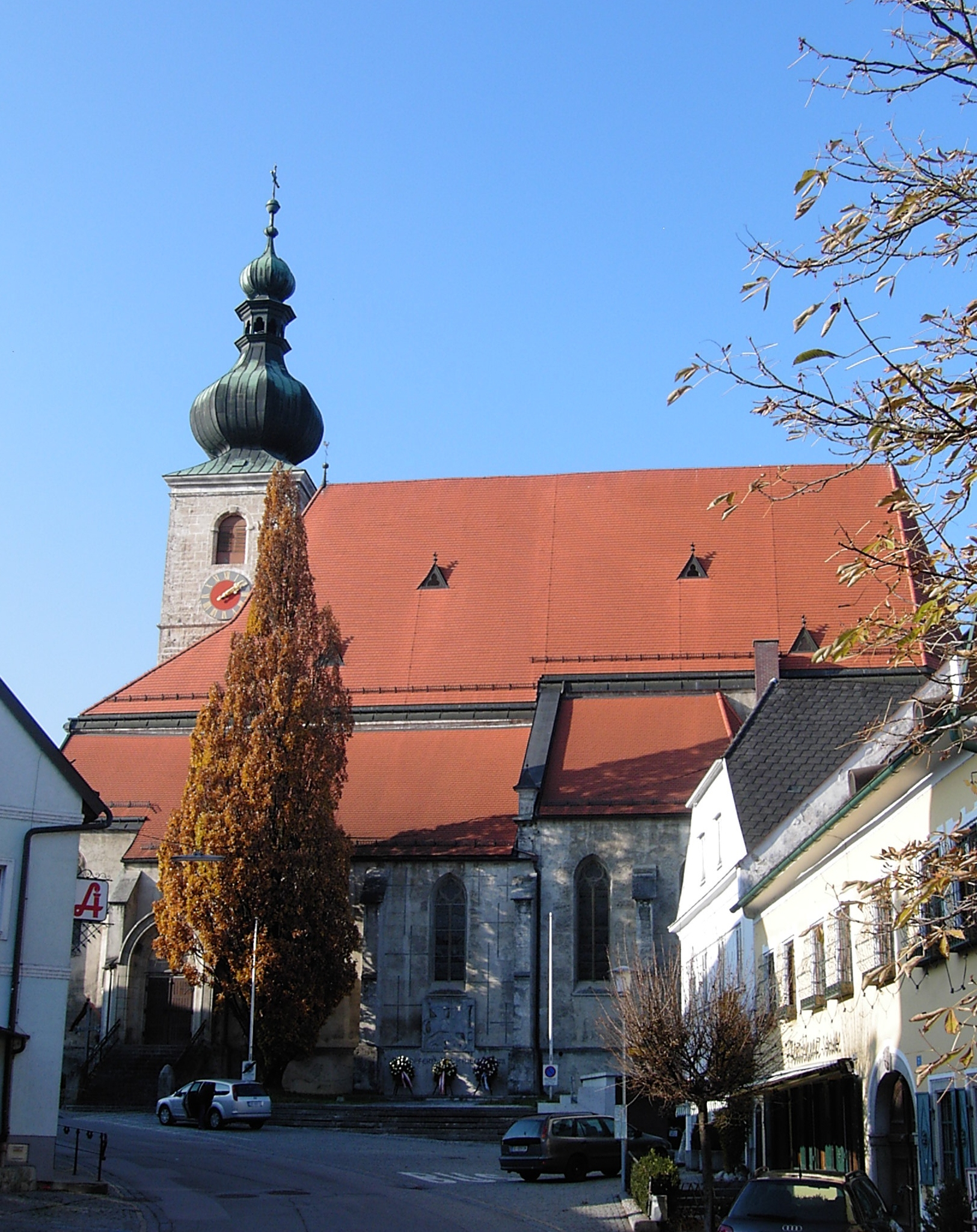

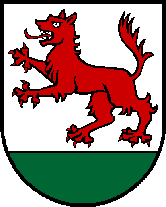
- Coat of arms

- Location within Austria
- Coordinates: 48°02′41″N 14°18′36″E
- Country: Austria
- State: Upper Austria
- District: Steyr-Land

Government
  - Mayor: Manfred Kalchmair (SPÖ)

Area
  - Total: 38.17 km^{2} (14.74 sq mi)
- Elevation: 367 m (1,204 ft)

Population (2018-01-01)
  - Total: 9,371
  - Density: 245.5/km^{2} (635.9/sq mi)
- Time zone: UTC+1 (CET)
  - Summer (DST): UTC+2 (CEST)
- Postal code: 4522
- Area code: 07259
- Vehicle registration: SE
- Website: sierning.at

Sierning is a municipality in the district of Steyr-Land in the Austrian state of Upper Austria.

== Geography ==
Sierning is located between the city of Steyr and the health resort Bad Hall on the Steyr river.
