= Traunviertel =

Region in Upper Austria

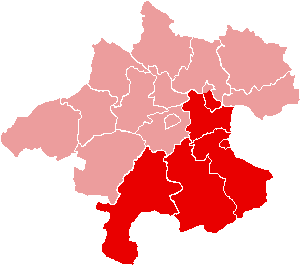
Map of the Traunviertel in Upper Austria

The Traunviertel is an Austrian region belonging to the state of Upper Austria. It is one of four "quarters" of Upper Austria and its name refers to the river Traun which passes through the area.

== Region ==
The district includes Linz-Land, Steyr-Land, Kirchdorf, Gmunden, Steyr and the city of Linz.

Major towns in Traunviertel include the capital of Upper Austria Linz, Gmunden, Kirchdorf an der Krems, and Steyr.
