= Schlierbach =

Schlierbach may refer to:

- Schlierbach (Göppingen), a community in the district of Göppingen, Baden-Württemberg, Germany
- Schlierbach, Haut-Rhin, commune in France
- Heidelberg-Schlierbach, a district of the city of Heidelberg, Baden-Württemberg, Germany
- Schlierbach, Schaafheim, a district of Schaafheim, Darmstadt-Dieburg, Hesse
- Schlierbach, Switzerland, a municipality in the canton of Lucerne
- Schlierbach, Austria, a municipality in Upper Austria
- Schlierbach Abbey, a monastery in Upper Austria
