= Saint George's Abbey, Längsee =

Church building in Austria

St. George's Abbey, Längsee
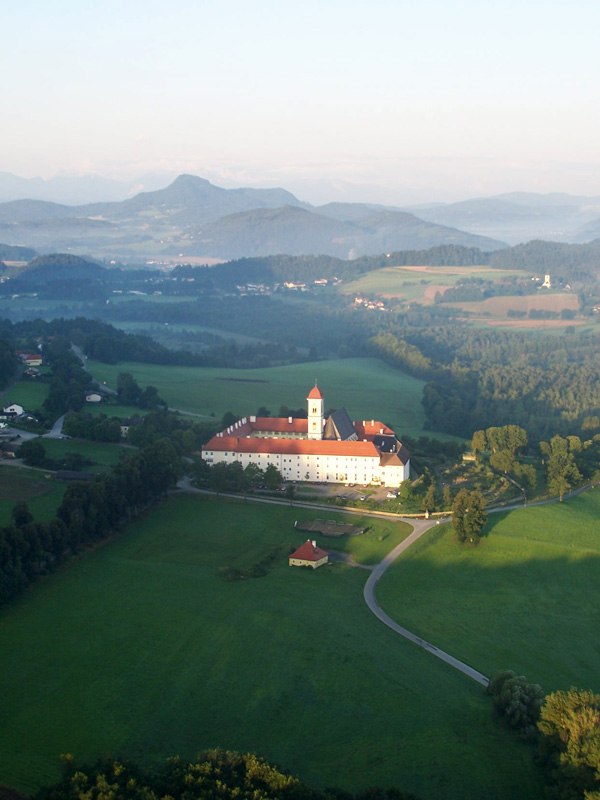
- Stift St. Georgen from the air

- Location within Austria
- Interactive map of St. George's Abbey, Längsee

Monastery information
- Order: Order of Saint Benedict
- Established: 1003
- Disestablished: 1783

Site
- Location: Sankt Georgen am Längsee, Austria
- Coordinates: 46.781111°N 14.430278°E
- Website: www.stift-stgeorgen.at

St. George's Abbey (German: Stift St. Georgen) is a monastic complex in the village of Sankt Georgen am Längsee, Carinthia, Austria. It celebrated its 1,000th anniversary in 2003.

== History ==
The monastery, a nunnery, was founded between 1002 and 1008 by the Countess Wichburg, the wife of Count Ottwin von Sonnenburg of Pustertal. Wichbirg was the sister of the Archbishop Hartwig. The founder's daughter Hildpurg, a nun in the Nonnberg Benedictine abbey in Salzburg, was blessed as the first abbess, and brought the first nuns with her. Count Ottwin and Countess Wichburg were entombed in the crypt of the convent. In the 12th century the convent was reformed. It was placed under the direction of the abbot Wolford of Admont Abbey in 1122. From the 1170s the convent returned to the suzerainty of Salzburg. There is a record of Ulrich II, Duke of Carinthia making a donation to the monastery on 31 March 1199.

The nunnery suffered economic difficulties, and had difficulty paying taxes to support the Turkish wars. At one point during the Protestant Reformation the community was reduced to the abbess Dorothea Rumpf and two other nuns. They later received support from the Göss Abbey, including the Abbess Afra von Staudach (1562), which helped renew the community. By 1683 the nunnery had 31 nuns and 16 lay sisters. It had an apothecary, and cared for as many as 500 invalids each year. The convent also ran a school.

1783 the monastery was dissolved by Emperor Joseph II. In 1788 it was put up for auction. Maximilian Thaddäus von Egger bought it for 163,100 gulden and made the monastery complex the new seat of the Count of Egger. The castle was opened to tourists around the end of the 18th century. In 1934 it was sold to the Missionary Order of Mariannhill. During World War II (1939–45) it served for a while as the seminary of Gurk, then was converted into a military hospital in 1943. The Marianhillers took the building back in 1948. In 1959 it was purchased by the Diocese of Gurk for use as an Episcopal educational establishment.

Today the former Benedictine nunnery includes a church where services are still held, an educational establishment run by the diocese, a hotel and seminar facilities.

== Building ==
The convent and the church, with its crypt, are built on stone foundations that date back to Roman times. The north-west wing of the present complex was built in 1546 In the years 1654 to 1658 the monastery was remodeled in the baroque style by the architect Pietro Francesco Carlone. The impressive high altar was probably built in the late 17th century. Parts of the original buildings and the Renaissance arcades in the northern courtyard have been preserved.

== Gallery ==
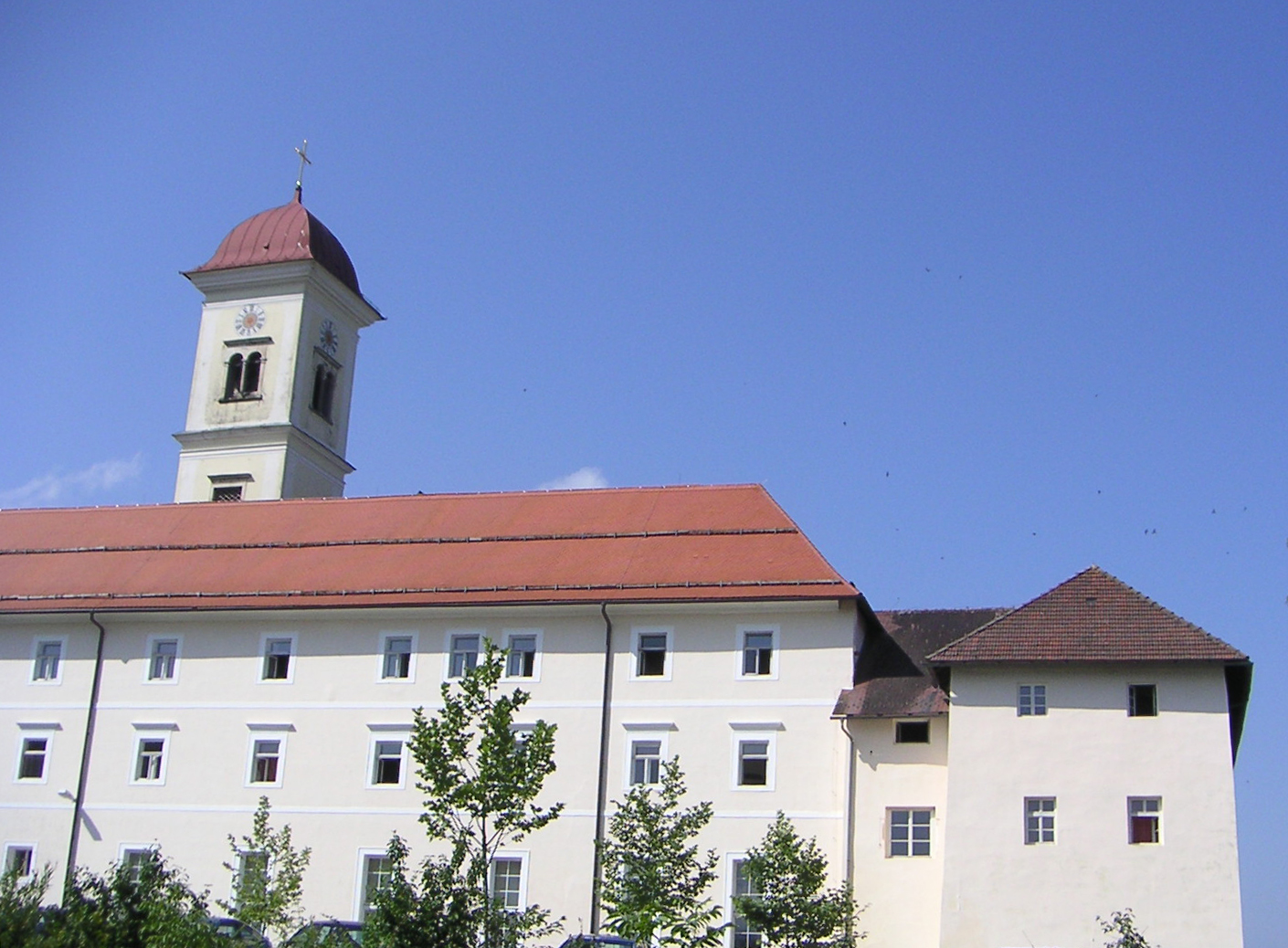
Monastery

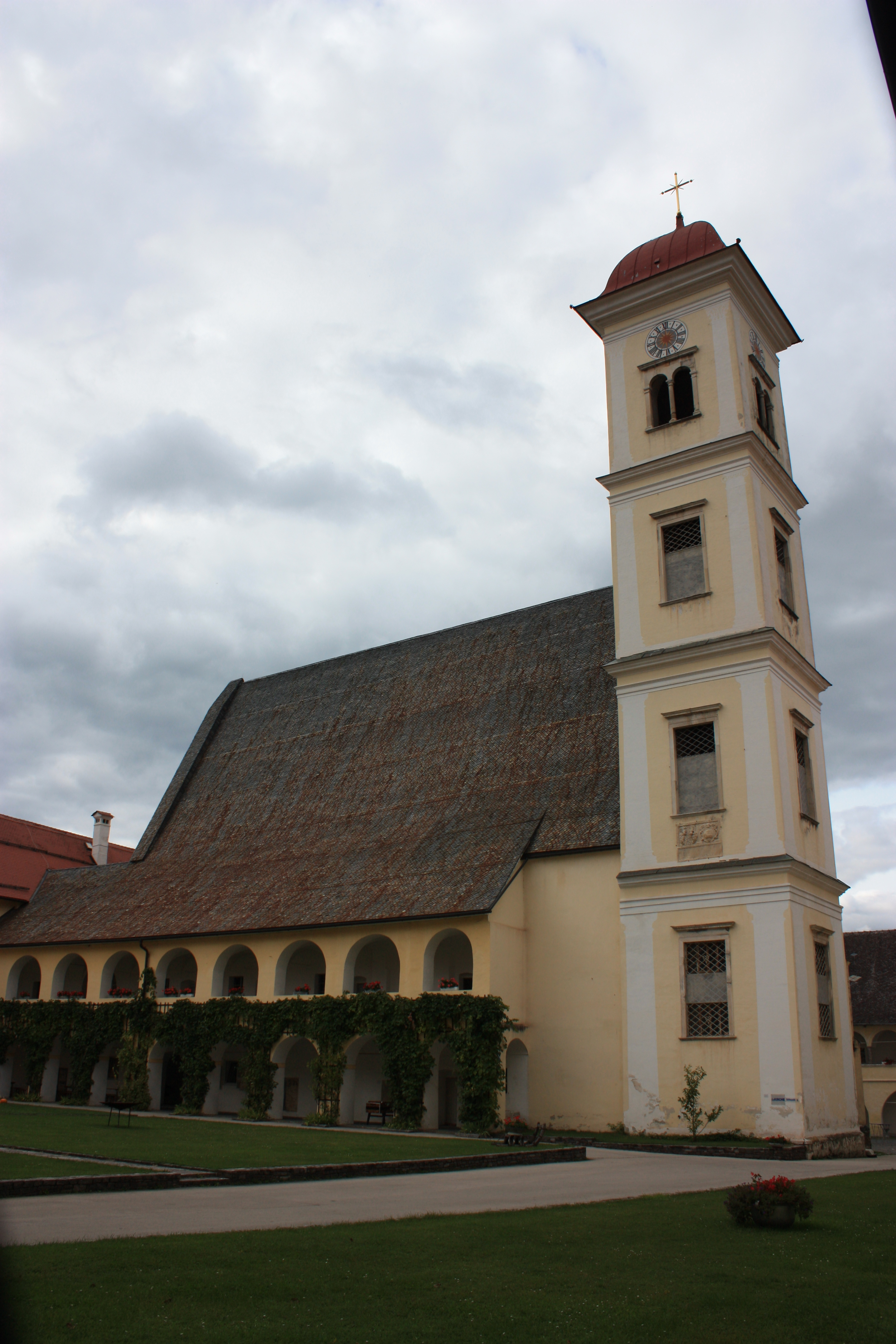
Church

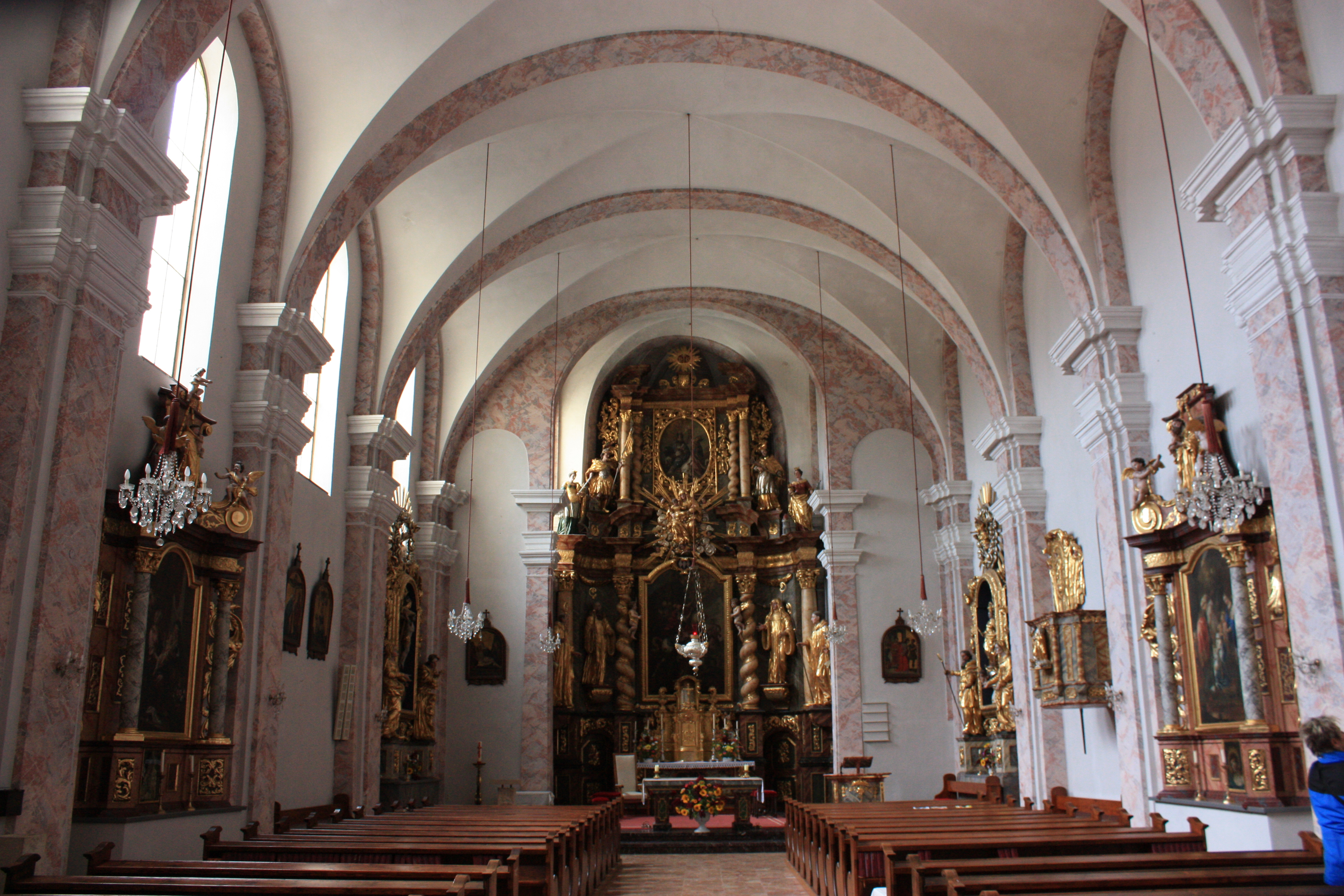
Church interior

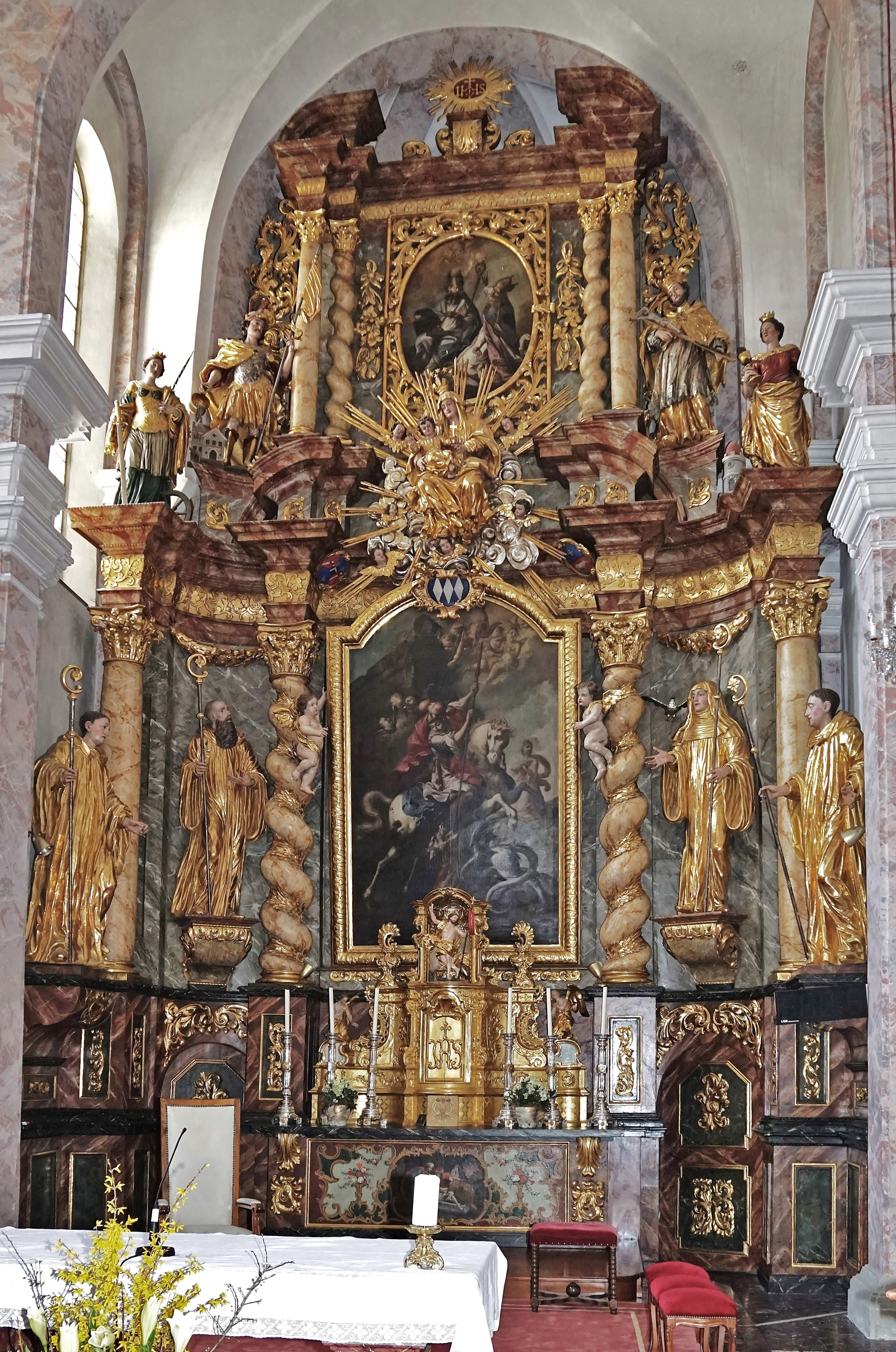
High altar
