= Carlo Antonio Carlone =

Italian Baroque architect active in Austria (c. 1635–1708)

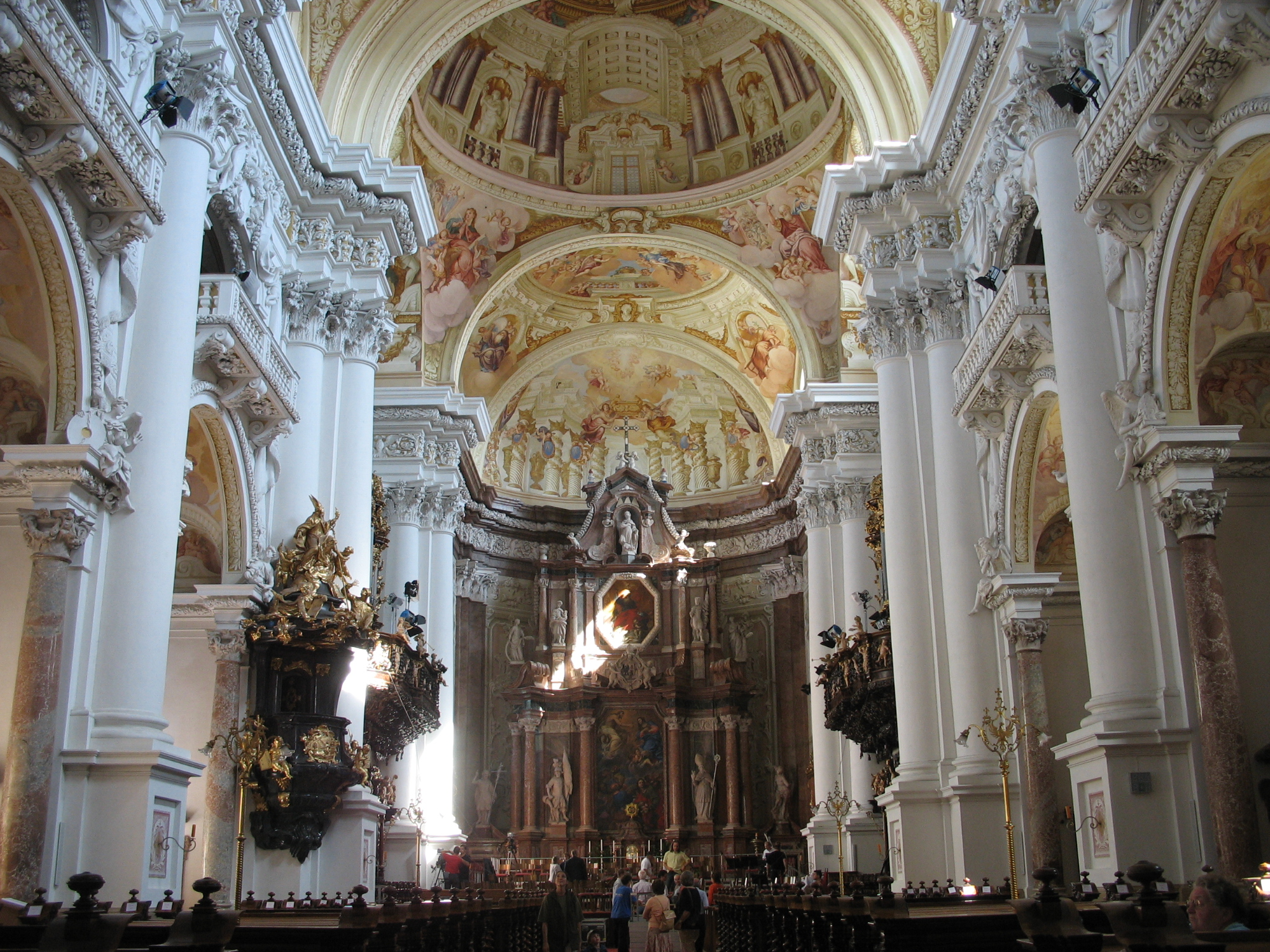
- The abbey church of St. Florian Monastery, Carlone's principal work
- Born: c. 1635; Scaria, Lanzo d'Intelvi, Duchy of Milan
- Died: 3 May 1708; Passau, Holy Roman Empire
- Resting place: St. Nikola, Passau
- Occupations: Architect, master builder
- Movement: Baroque
- Relatives: Pietro Francesco Carlone (father)
- Buildings: St. Florian Monastery; Garsten Abbey; Schlierbach Abbey; Pilgrimage church of Christkindl, Steyr; Façade of the Kirche am Hof, Vienna

Carlo Antonio Carlone (also Carloni; c. 1635 – 3 May 1708) was an Italian Baroque architect and master builder who worked in Upper Austria, Styria and Lower Bavaria. A member of the Carlone family of artists from the Intelvi valley, he was abbey architect of Garsten, Seckau and St. Florian, and he has been described as the most important architect active in Austria in the 17th century. His masterpiece, the Baroque rebuilding of St. Florian Monastery (1686–1708), was completed after his death by Jakob Prandtauer.

== Life ==
Carlone was born around 1635 in Scaria, a hamlet of Lanzo d'Intelvi in the Intelvi valley north of Lake Como, an area that produced many generations of builders, stuccoists and painters who worked north of the Alps. His father, Pietro Francesco Carlone, was a master builder active mainly in Styria, where he served as abbey architect of Seckau from 1658 to 1682. His brother Giovanni Battista Carlone was a stuccoist who from 1677 directed the stucco decoration of Passau Cathedral; another brother, Bartolomeo, was also a stuccoist and worked on the interiors of St. Florian, Garsten and Rohrbach.

Carlo Antonio is first recorded in 1651 as an assistant to his father. In 1661 he represented him at Seckau Abbey, and from 1663 he is documented as foreman (Polier) on the construction of the palace at Eisenstadt, while also carrying out modest buildings of his own, some of them to his father's designs. In 1662, on the commission of the dowager empress Eleonora Gonzaga, he built the Baroque façade of the Kirche am Hof (Church of the Nine Choirs of Angels) in Vienna. The Jesuit church in Passau (now St. Michael), built in 1673–1677, is probably his work.

After his father's death he became independent. In 1681 he was appointed master builder of Garsten Abbey; from 1682 to 1684 he succeeded his father as abbey architect of Seckau; and from 1686 until his death he was abbey architect of St. Florian. In these years he produced a large number of ecclesiastical and secular buildings in Upper Austria, Styria and Lower Bavaria. He died in Passau on 3 May 1708 and was buried in the church of the Augustinian canons of St. Nikola, whose monastery buildings he had designed.

== Work ==
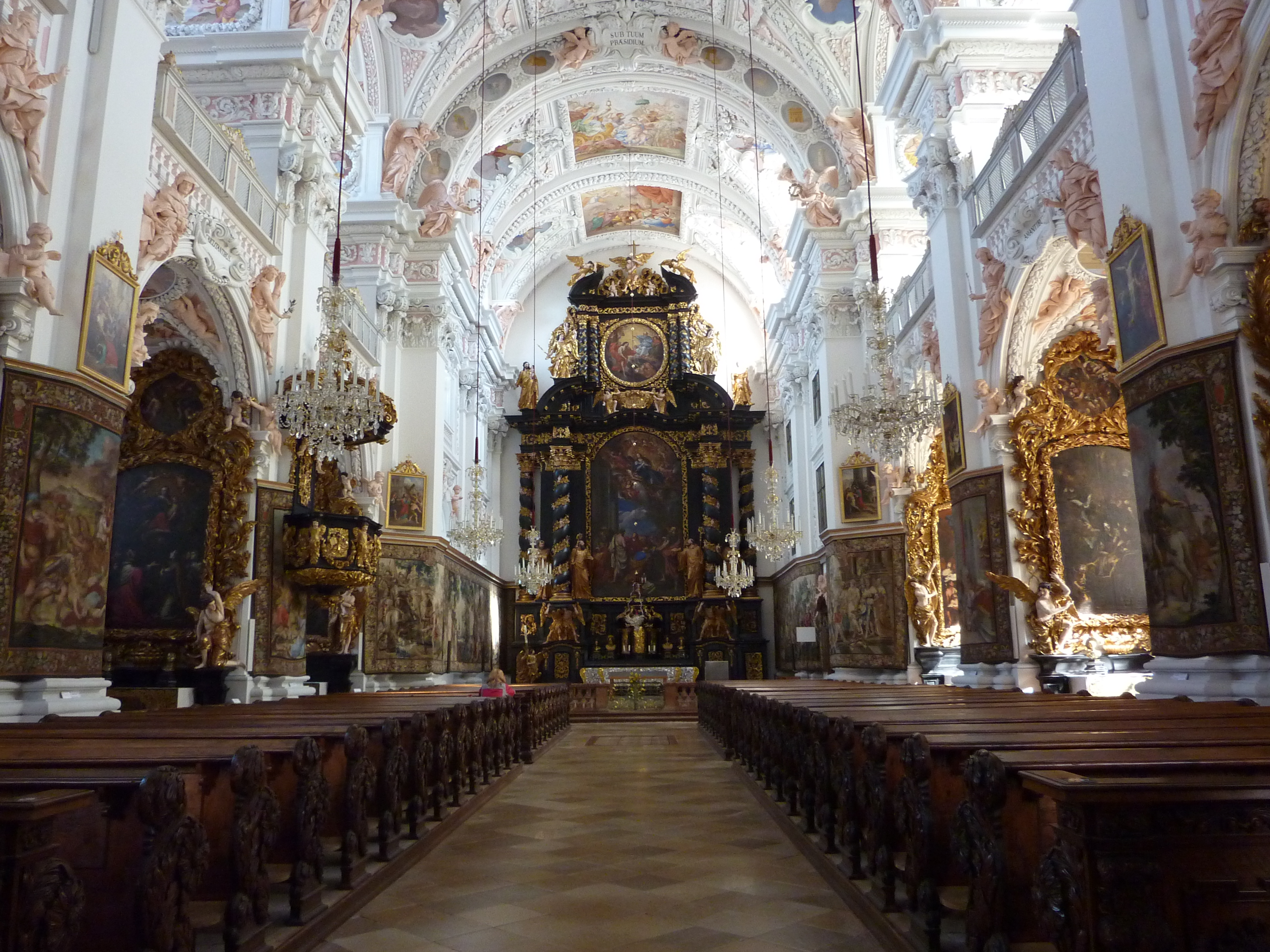
Interior of the former abbey church of Garsten, built by Carlone and his brothers to a design by their father

Some of Carlones first independent projects were St Marys Chapel in Kremsmünster Abbey (1676) and a hospital at Wernstein am Inn (1677). He was employed as a consulting architect on the Baroque conversion of Kremsmünsters abbey church during 1680–1681. His Fischkalter from 1690 to 1692 which are found here are some of his more delightful works. He constructed the abbey church at Garsten between 1685 and 1693 according to his fathers designs along with his brother Giovanni Battista. He also designed the Losenstein chapel which dates from the same period and after 1695 worked on the monastery buildings. The high altar is also by him. He also worked at Schlierbach Abbey on the new church which was built to his fathers designs during 1680–1683. Carlone may have also worked at Admont Abbey in 1681 and is credited with the pilgrimage church at Frauenberg close to Admont (1683).

His principal work is the rebuilding of St. Florian Monastery, begun in 1686. Carlone directed the work until his death, after which Jakob Prandtauer continued and completed it; the result is the largest monastery in Upper Austria and one of the most impressive examples of Baroque architecture in the country. Among his many smaller churches are the centrally planned church of St. Giles (Ägidiuskirche) at Vöcklabruck (1688), the castle chapel at Marbach near Ried in der Riedmark (1686–1689), the pilgrimage church of Heiligenkreuz near Kremsmünster (1687–1690), the parish churches of Ansfelden (1690–1707), Oepping (1694) and Rohrbach (1696–1700), and the summer refectory of Reichersberg Abbey (1691–1695). He was also largely responsible for the Baroque remodelling of the former abbey church of Baumgartenberg (1697) and of the choir of the parish church of Niederzirking, and he probably designed the abbey church of Pöllau, executed from 1701 by Joachim Carlone. His last works were the pilgrimage church of Christkindl near Steyr, begun in 1702 and finished after his death by Prandtauer, and, probably, the north wing of Lambach Abbey (1706–1707).

The pilgrimage church of Christkindl near Steyr, begun by Carlone in 1702

He often used family members to work with him most notably his brother Giovanni Battista. Whose stucco work helped add to the joyous feel of Carlones interior rooms. In the judgement of Alfred Schmeller, Carlone paved the way for Austrian and south German architects to develop their own form of Baroque. His churches have an enormous size not seen before in Austria and he brought over ideas from Italy regarding mass which Austrian Masters would use but make lighter than his. At St. Florian his immediate successor was Prandtauer, the architect of Melk Abbey, and a direct influence of Carlone on the plan of the Melk abbey church has been suggested.

== Selected works ==
- Chapel of St. Mary, Kremsmünster Abbey (1676), and a wing of the monastery
- Hospital building, Wernstein am Inn (1677)
- Abbey church of Garsten (1685–1693, with Giovanni Battista Carlone, to the design of Pietro Francesco Carlone); Losenstein chapel (1685–1693); monastery buildings (after 1695)
- Abbey church of Schlierbach (1680–1683, to the design of Pietro Francesco Carlone)
- Pilgrimage church of Frauenberg near Admont, Styria (1683, attributed)
- St. Florian Monastery, church and monastery buildings (1686–1708, completed by Jakob Prandtauer)
- Castle chapel, Marbach near Ried in der Riedmark (1686–1689)
- Pilgrimage church of Heiligenkreuz near Kremsmünster (1687–1690)
- St. Giles's Church (Ägidiuskirche), Vöcklabruck (1688)
- Calvary chapel, Schwertberg (1689)
- Parish church of Ansfelden (1690–1707)
- Fish basins (Fischkalter), Kremsmünster Abbey (1690–1692)
- Summer refectory, Reichersberg Abbey (1691–1695)
- Parish church of Oepping (1694)
- Parish church of Rohrbach (1696–1700)
- Baroque remodelling of the former abbey church of Baumgartenberg (1697)
- Pilgrimage church of Christkindl, Steyr (begun 1702; completed by Jakob Prandtauer)
- North wing of Lambach Abbey (1706–1707, attributed)
