= St. Michael's Church, Passau =

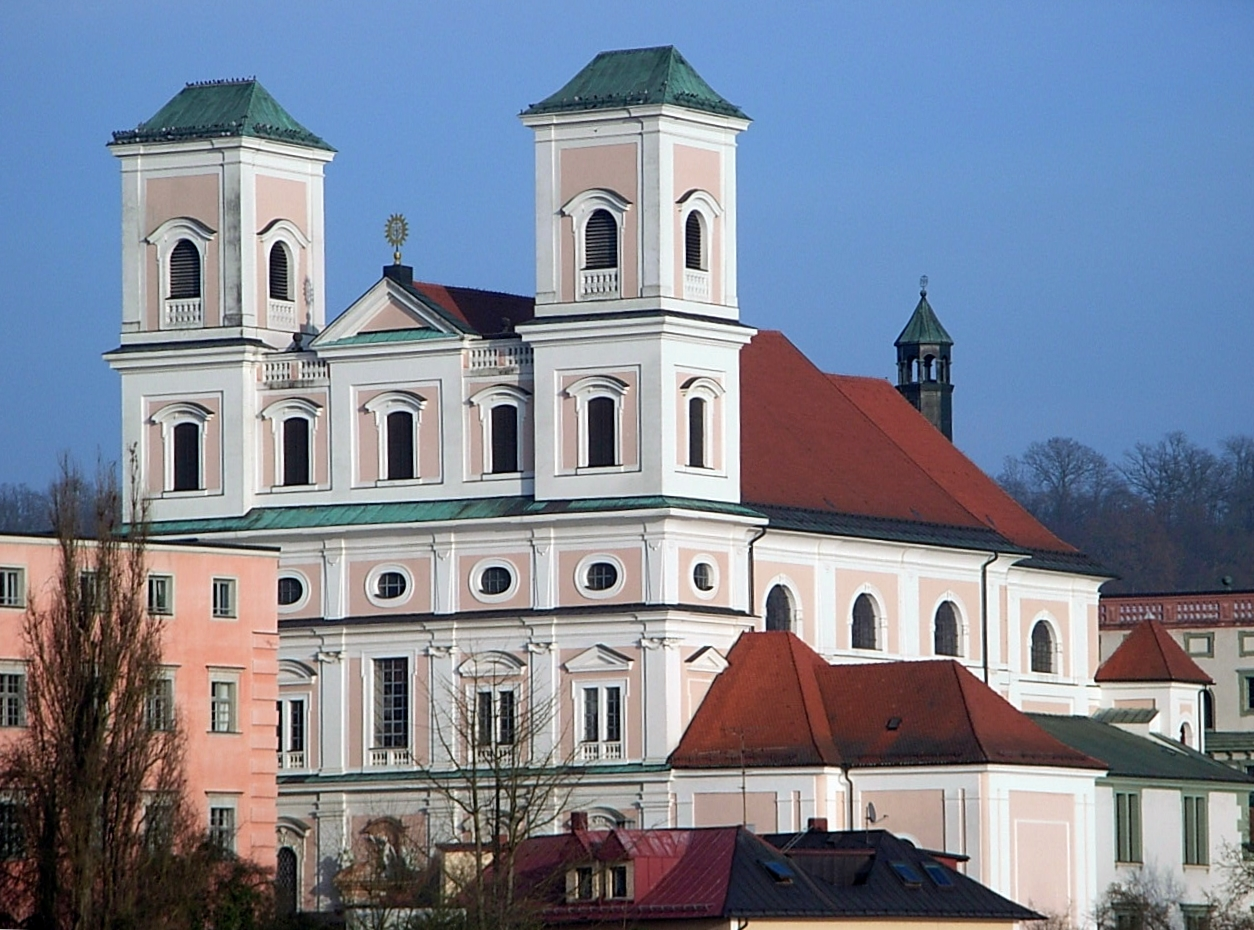
- St. Michael, Passau, December 2006

- Location in Bavaria St. Michael's Church, Passau (Germany)
- 48°34′25″N 13°28′11″E
- Location: Passau
- Country: Bavaria, Germany
- Denomination: Roman Catholic

History
- Founded: 1678

Architecture
- Architect: Pietro Francesco Carlone
- Style: Baroque

St. Michael's Church (German: Kirche St. Michael, also called Studienkirche or Jesuitenkirche) is a 17th church in Passau, Bavaria, Germany with later additions in the baroque style. It is attached to the Leopoldinum School, Passau.

== History ==
Passau was once the capital of a prince-bishopric covering 24 square miles (62 km^{2}) with 60,000 people. The Jesuits were brought to Passau in 1611 by Prince Bishop Leopold V, Archduke of Further Austria. They established a college, designed by the priest Johannes Isfording from Molsheim, Alsace, which provided secondary education and also served as the seminary for the diocese until 1766.

The Jesuits built a church in 1612, which was destroyed in the city fire of 1662. Much of the town including the cathedral was burned down in this fire. Between 1665 and 1678 the Jesuits built St. Michael's Church, designed by Pietro Francesco Carlone, the architect of the Church of St. Ignatius, Linz. The Jesuits were supported in their construction work by Sebastian, Count von Potting und Persing, Prince-bishop of Passau. The church is on the north side of the Inn River, just before it joins with the Danube.

The Jesuits were formally suppressed by Pope Clement XIV in 1773. The bishopric was secularized in 1803. By 1837 the population was just 9,400, and the city was a frontier town of the Kingdom of Bavaria. The Jesuit's College, a vast building from the 17th century, was now a school. In 1879 the former Jesuit College was an Academy of Arts. It included a coin collection with 20,000 Greek, 18,000 Roman and 40,000 other medals, and a museum of natural history.

Today the seminary buildings hold the University of Passau faculty of Catholic theology. The college library is now the Passau State Library. It includes 360,000 books, including over five hundred printed before 1501. There are 320 manuscripts, some of which are from the 13th century and are beautifully illustrated. The library holds the Vornbach Bible of 1421 and still has a coin collection. The former monastery building is a college preparatory school.

== Building ==
The church and the adjoining college have typically Italian exteriors. The exterior of the church was made relatively simple at the request of the bishop to avoid competing with the cathedral. The interior has a straightforward layout with pilasters. The white interior with its barrel vault is decorated with stucco work by Giovanni Battista Carlone and his workshop. There is a 1725 chapel on the southern wall in early rococo style, dedicated to Francis Xavier.

The local artists Johann Seitz and Matthias Högenwald of Passau made the black and gold side altars in 1678. The high altar was designed in 1712 by Christoph Tausch, a Jesuit architect from Breslau, with a 1714 painting of the fallen angel by Carlo Innocenzo Carlone. The pulpit is thought to have been made by Joseph Matthias Götz, who also did initial work on the Fürstenzell Abbey church, and was completed in 1715. The organ casing was carved in 1715 by Joseph Hartmann. The church has paintings by artists such as Johann Spillenberger, Frans de Neve and Bartolomeo Altomonte. Large statues of angels are the work of Diego Francesco Carlone with stucco by Ignaz Albrecht Provisore.

== Gallery ==
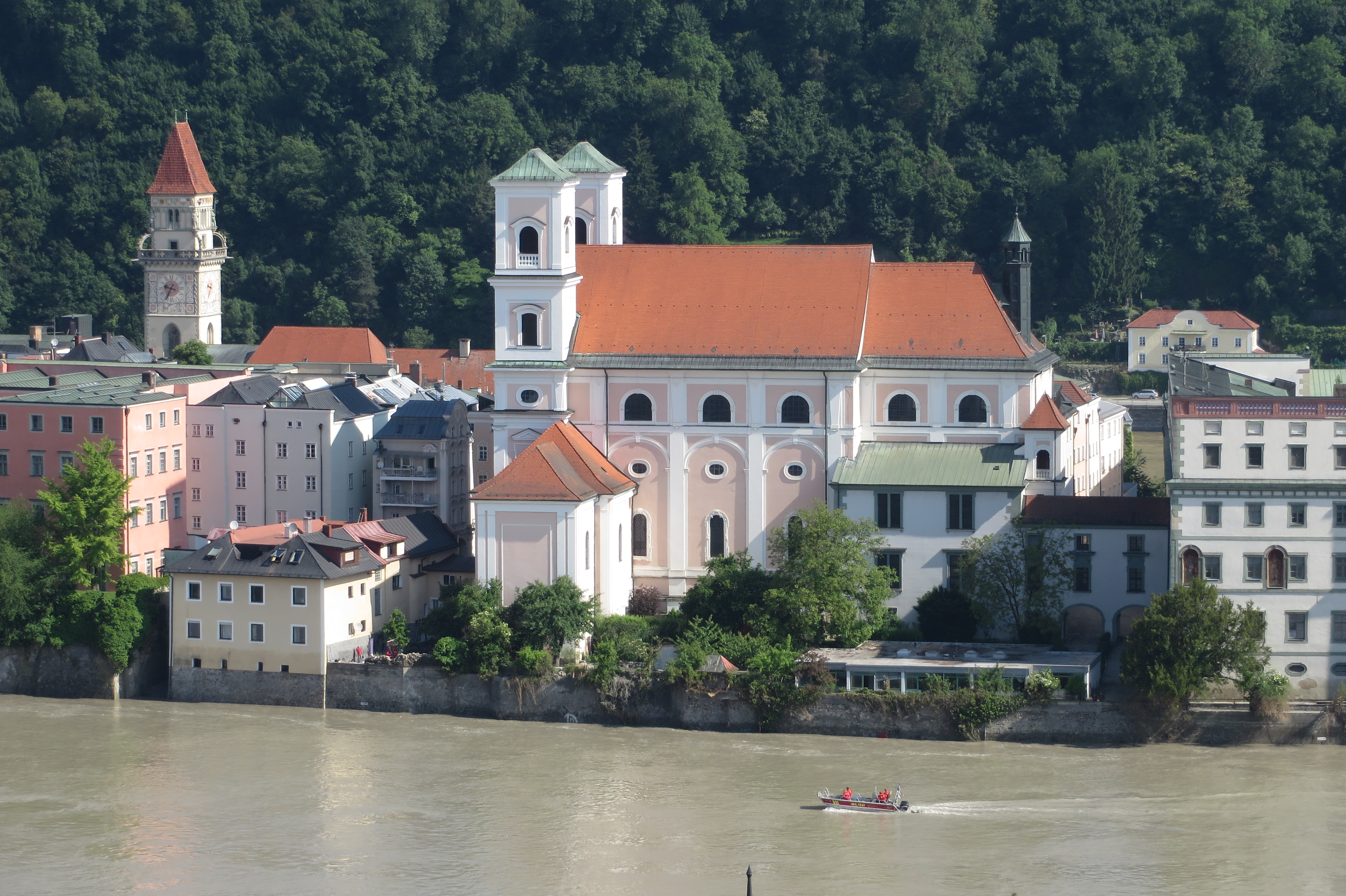
From the river after flood in June 2013

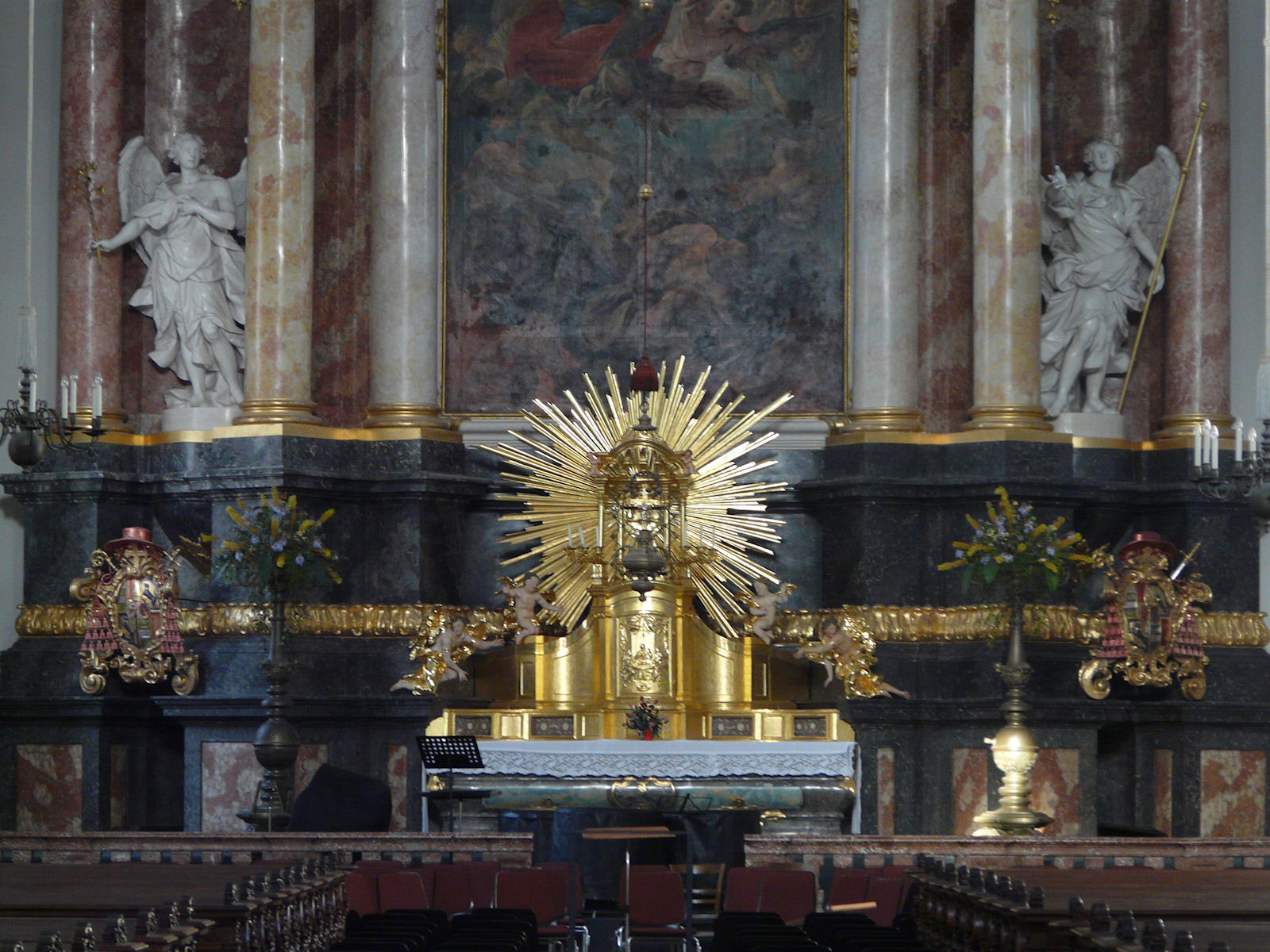
Altar

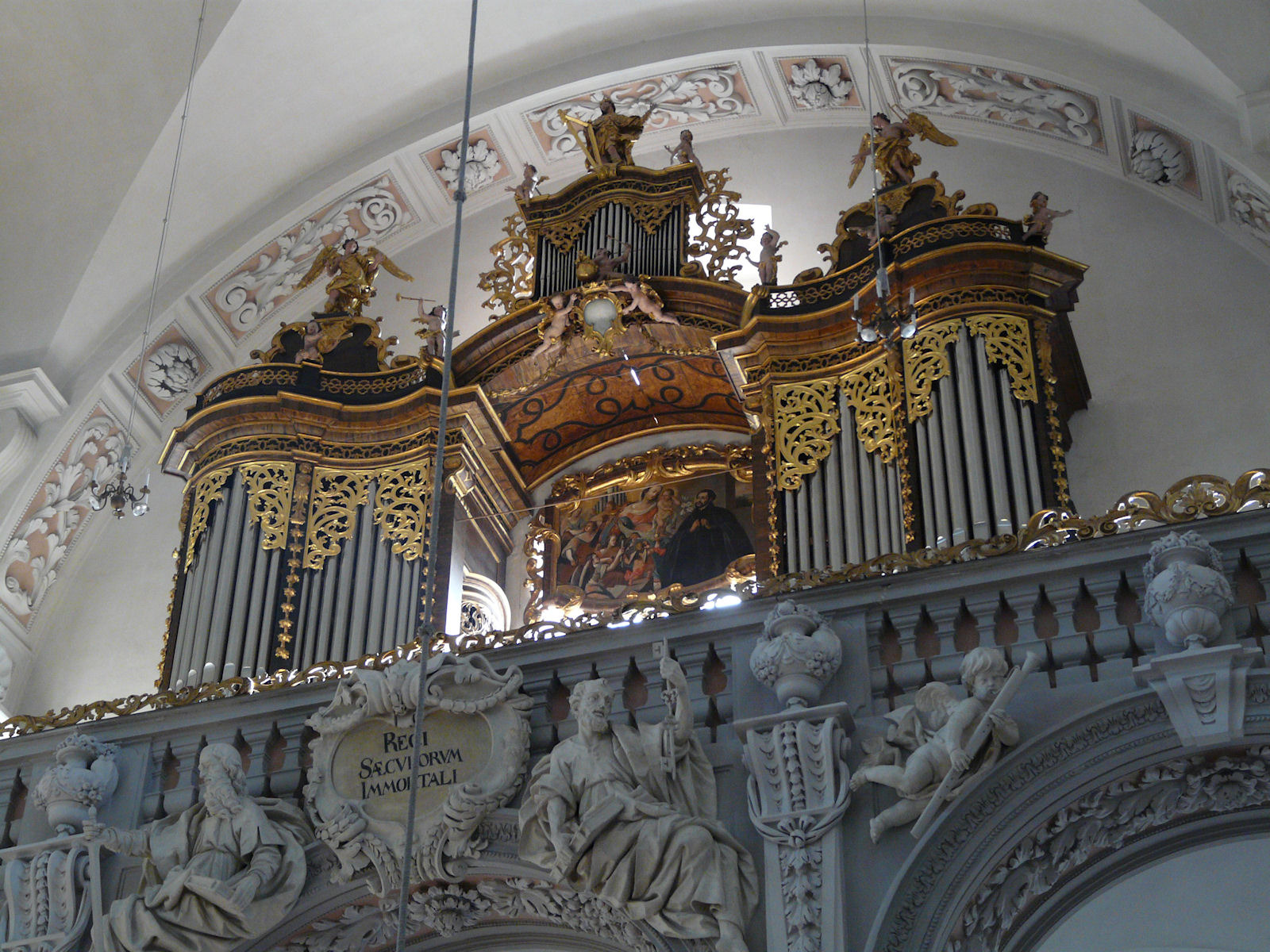
Organ
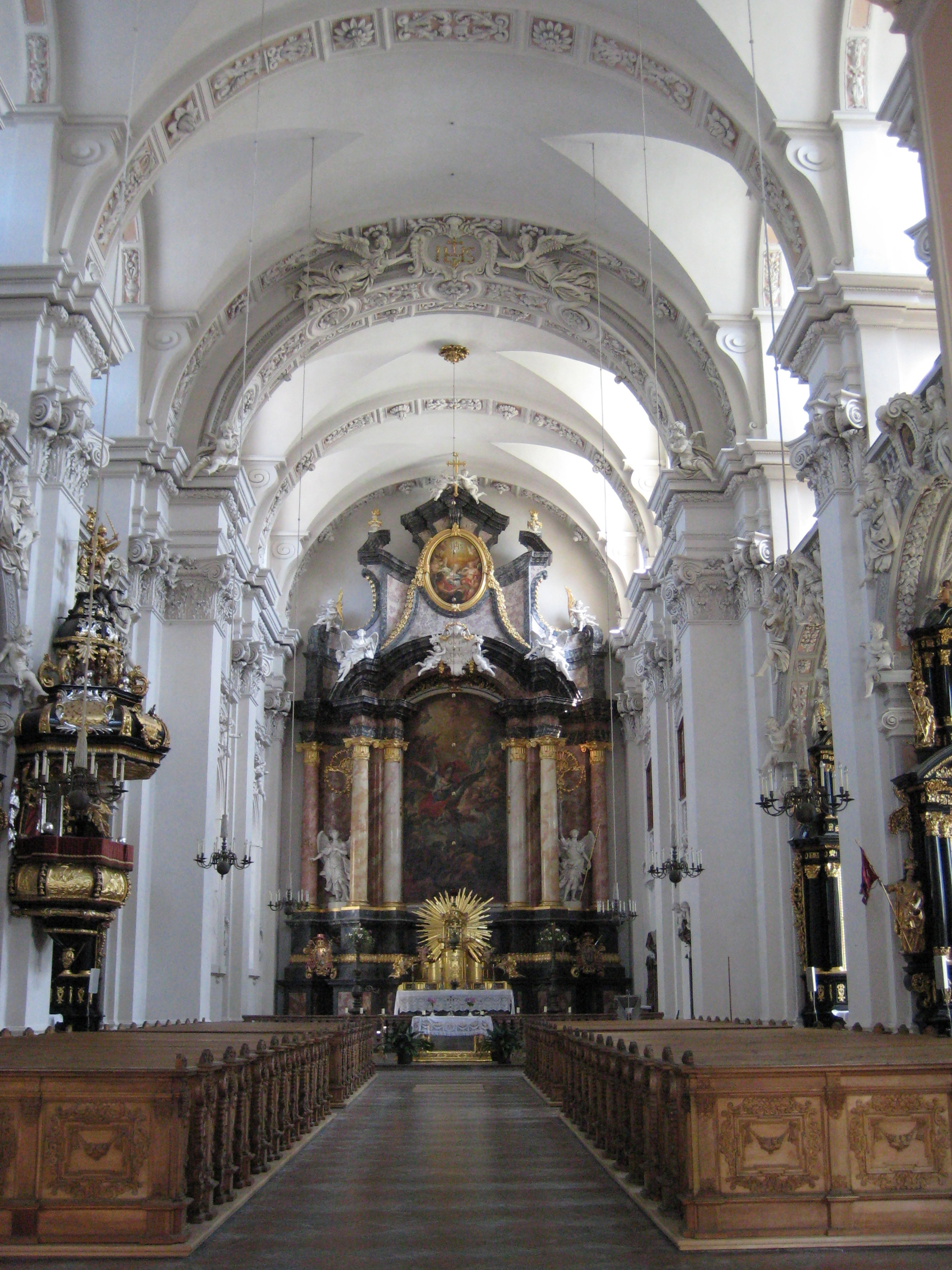
Interior

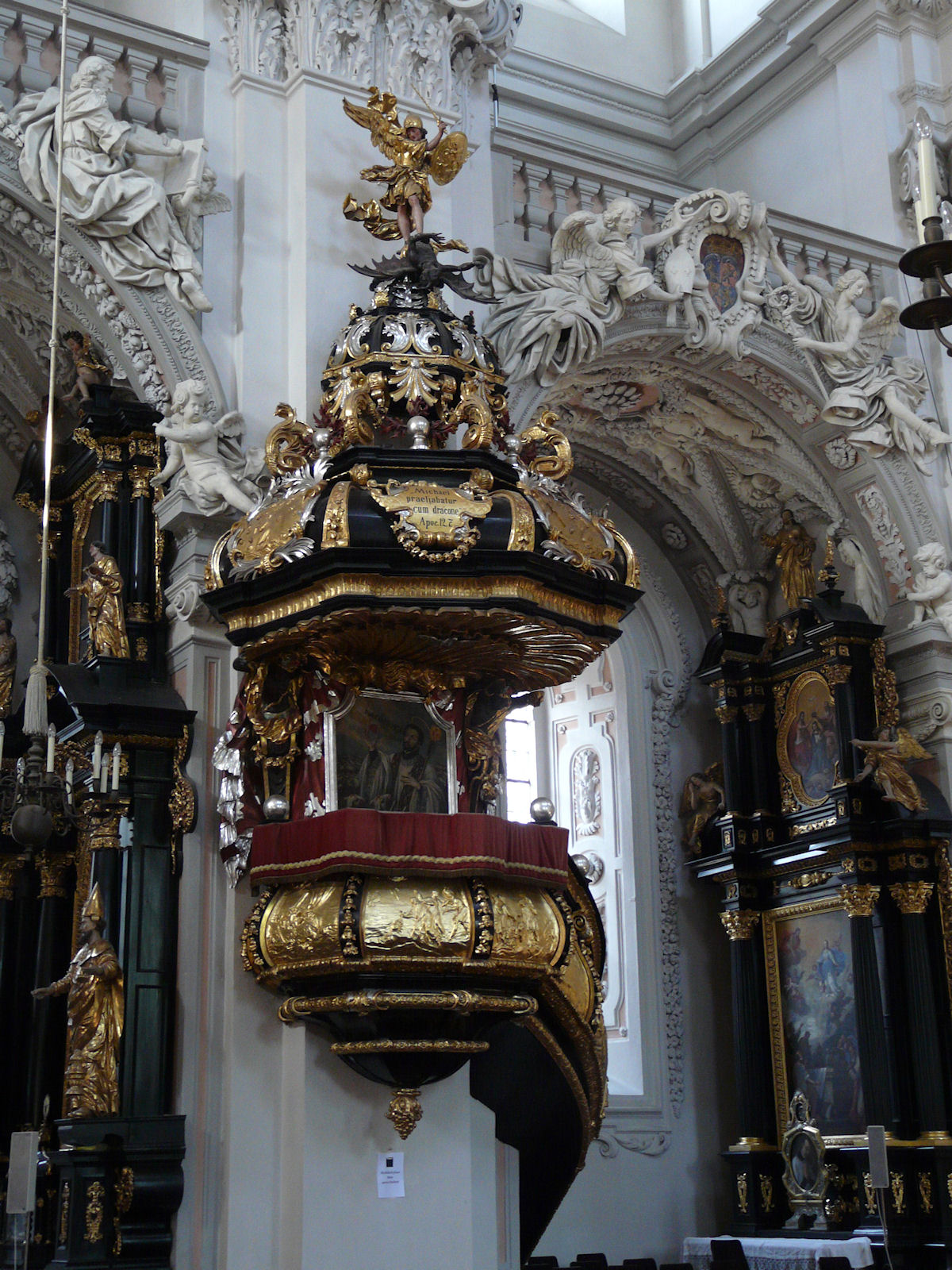
Pulpit

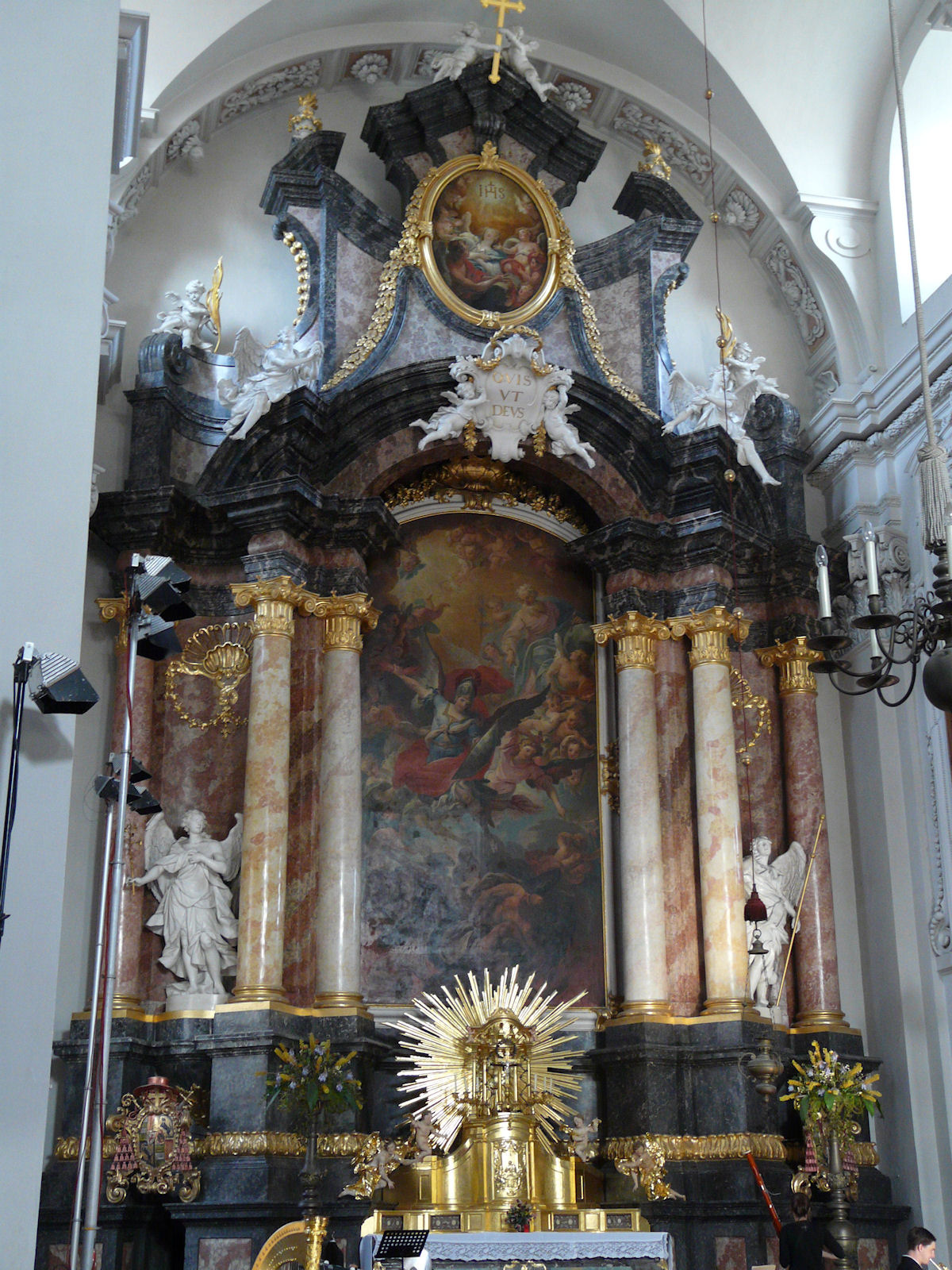
Altar

== See also ==
- List of Jesuit sites
