= Schlierbach, Austria =

Schlierbach
- Municipality
- Coat of arms

- Location within Austria
- Coordinates: 47°56′01″N 14°07′39″E
- Country: Austria
- State: Upper Austria
- District: Kirchdorf an der Krems

Government
  - Mayor: Katharina Seebacher (ÖVP)

Area
  - Total: 18.44 km^{2} (7.12 sq mi)
- Elevation: 478 m (1,568 ft)

Population (2018-01-01)
  - Total: 2,858
  - Density: 155.0/km^{2} (401.4/sq mi)
- Time zone: UTC+1 (CET)
  - Summer (DST): UTC+2 (CEST)
- Postal code: 4553
- Area code: 07582
- Vehicle registration: KI
- Website: www.schlierbach.at

Schlierbach is a municipality in the district of Kirchdorf an der Krems in the Austrian state of Upper Austria.

Schlierbach is located 40 km in the south of Linz, the main city of Upper Austria.

== Schlierbach Abbey ==
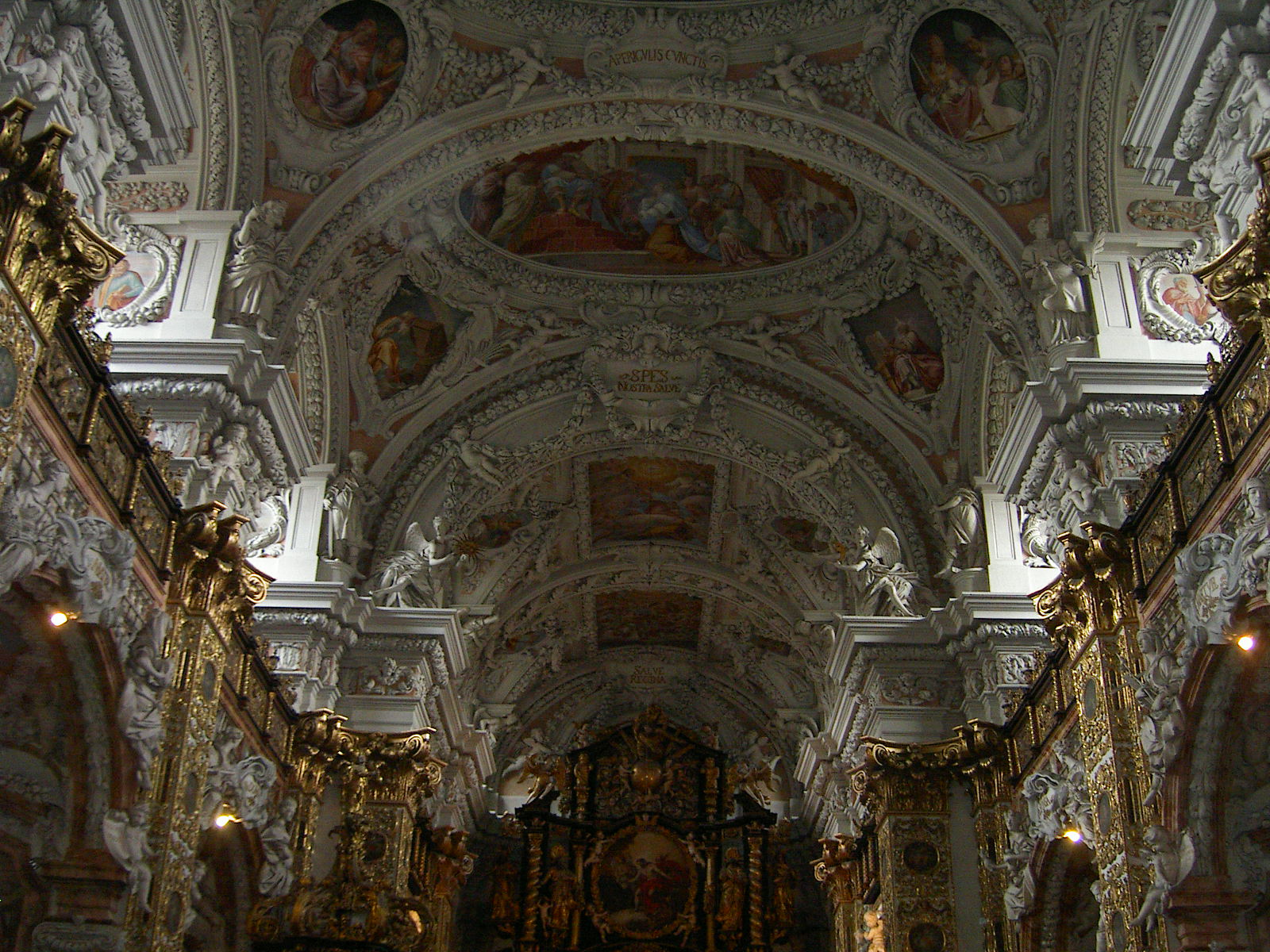
inside of the Schlierbach Abbey Church

The Schlierbach Abbey is a climax of the Austrian baroque architecture. It was founded in the 14th century as a convent. In the 17th century it was re-founded as a Cistercian monastery. Between 1680-1712 the buildings were renovated in the Baroque style following plans by Pietro Francesco Carlone that were executed by his sons.

The Abbey Church was built from 1680 to 1682 in baroque style with sculptures, plaster-work and frescoes by members of the Italian art family Carlone. The library is a baroque ceremonial room with plaster decorations of the ceiling and walls, constructed in 1712. The Bernardisaal is a ceremonial room, amply decorated in the baroque style.
