= Pietro Francesco Carlone =

- Born: Before 1607
- Died: 1681 or 1682; Garsten
- Occupation: Architect
- Known for: Abbeys

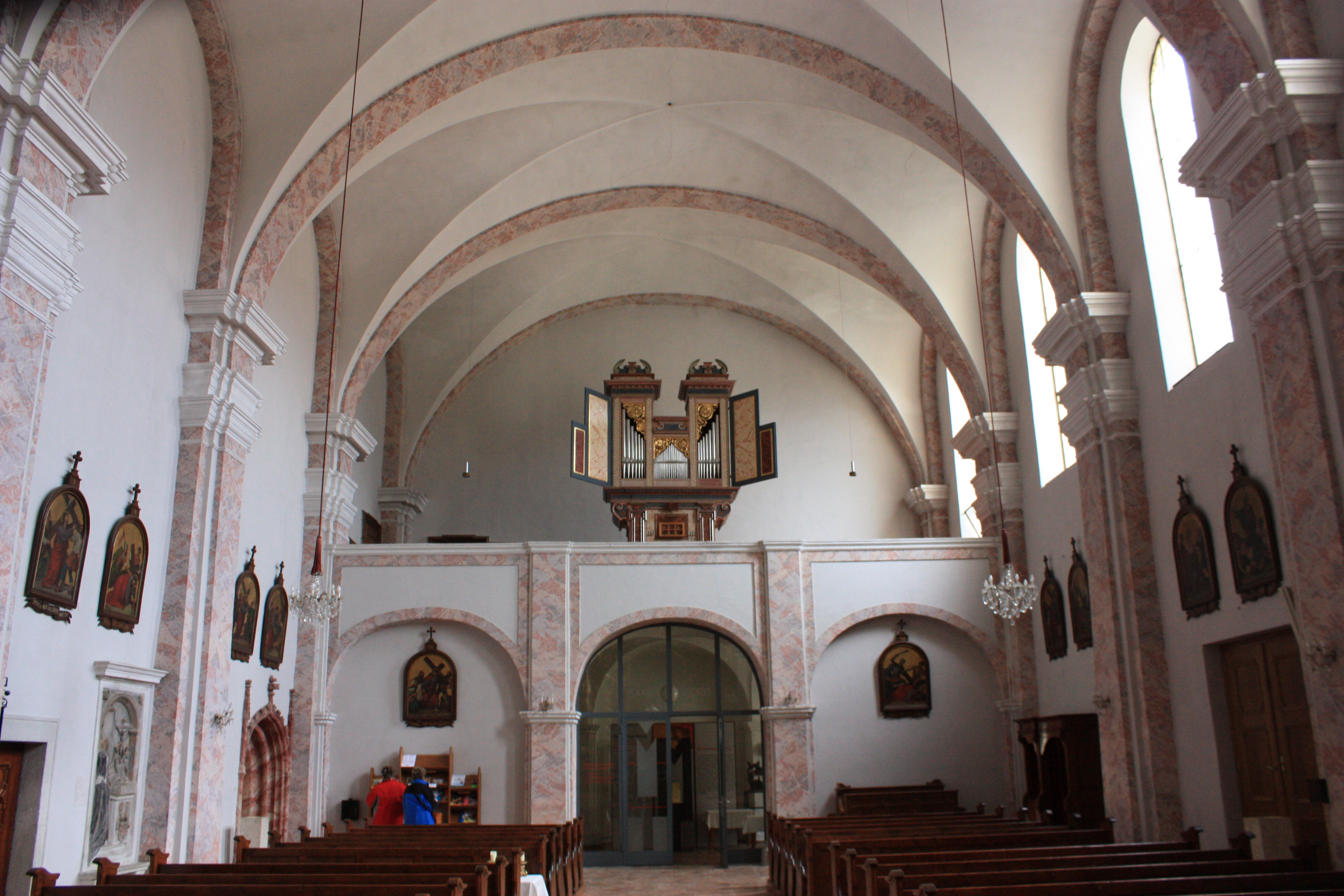
View of organ loft in Saint George's Abbey, Längsee

Pietro Francesco Carlone (Before 1607 – 1681–82), or Peter Franz Carlone, from the Leoben branch of the Carlone family, was an early Baroque architect who was best known for building abbeys.

== Life ==
Carlone was born some time before 1607, from a family of builders and later Burgers of Leoben. He probably began his career in 1625 as an assistant to his father. Stories about his being involved in disturbances and serving a jail term as a youth are not clearly documented.

In 1631 Carlone was resident in Röthelstein, where in 1650 he was described as a master stonemason. He worked among other projects on abbey buildings in Gurk (1637) and Göss (from 1652). In 1671 an order for sheet copper shows he was in Passau, in 1677 he was in Garsten, Judenburg and Seckau. In 1678 he was again in Garsten, where he made the designs for his sons to build the monastery church (1685–1693).

Pietro Francesco Carlone died in Garsten. The year of his death is disputed, with different sources giving 1680, 1681 or 1682. He had followed the footsteps of his father, from whom he had learned the craft. In the same way he brought his children into his building company. They first worked as his assistants, later as employees and representatives of the enterprise, and continued the business after his death.

== Descendants ==
- Carlo Antonio Carlone (Born 1635 in Scaria, Lombardy, Italy, died May 3, 1708, in Passau), his father's assistant from 1651, in 1661 was an abbey builder in Seckau, then worked according to the plans of the Father, and later as an independent builder. He was the architect of St. Florian Monastery.
- Giovanni Battista Carlone (c. 1640/1642 – c. 1717 ), worked with his father and brother at the Garsten Abbey church, among other projects.
- Bartholomeo Carlone

== Work ==
Pietro Francesco Carlone was mainly committed to abbey building. He worked during the Counter-Reformation and revival of the Catholic Church, undertaking work for the Jesuit order (1568–1584) using the architecture of baroque churches throughout Europe as a model. Like other builders and stucco-workers in his family, including his generation and the next, Carlone built in the so-called "Jesuit style". However, the Carlones in Austria followed the spread in northern Italy of the pilaster style of church with galleries, barrel vault, straight chancel without transept and twin-tower facade. The innovative element of "Carlone" churches is not so much the design, but rather the opulent splendor of the stucco decorations.

The first buildings associated with the name of Pietro Francesco Carlone are the chapel dedicated to St. Sebastian in Frohnleiten in 1625, and a bathhouse created in 1631 for the Congregation of the Jesuits in Leoben.

=== Chapter tract of the pin in Gurk (1637/38) ===
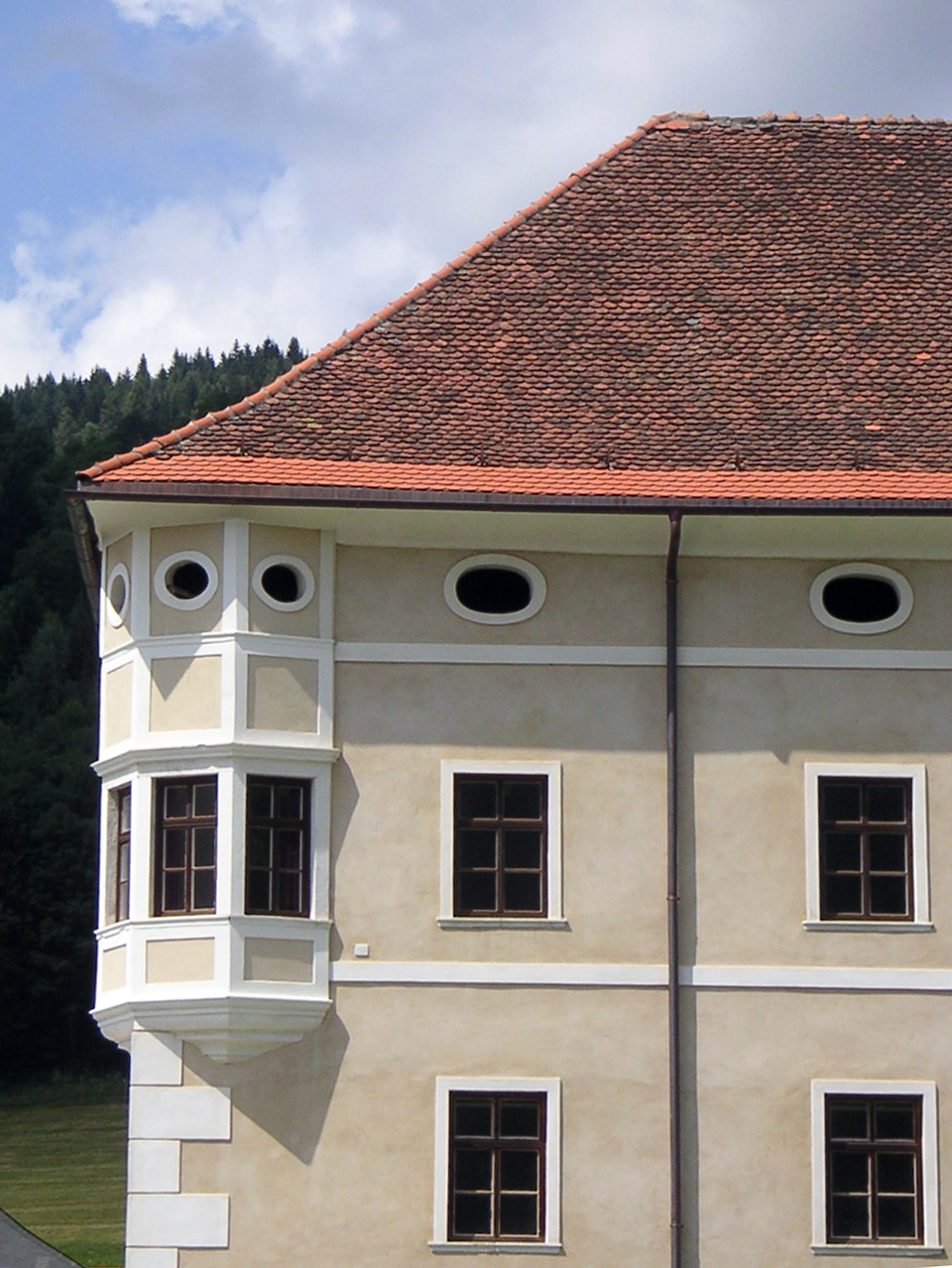
Cloister (1637–1638) at the Gurk Cathedral

In 1637 Pietro Francesco Carlone laid the blueprint of the buildings for the Cathedral chapter to be built to the north of the transept of the Gurk Cathedral. This was built in 1637–38 to replace the former abbey buildings of Gurk. The builder incorporated existing structures in the work, which was purely functional and largely dispensed with artistic design.

This was followed by an imperial hunting lodge (1639) near the Leopoldsteinersee and work on the water works (1644) in Innerberg, now Eisenerz.

=== Göss Abbey in Leoben (1652–1654) ===
Carlone was commissioned in 1650 with construction of the huge "Upper Convent" in the northwest of the church of the Benedictine Göss Abbey in Leoben. At that time it was under the direction of the Abbess Amalia von Leisser. The groundbreaking ceremony took place in 1652 and the work was completed in 1654. In 1827 the building came into the possession of the wheelwrights' co-operative of Vordernberg.

=== Saint George's Abbey, Längsee (1654–1658/1659) ===
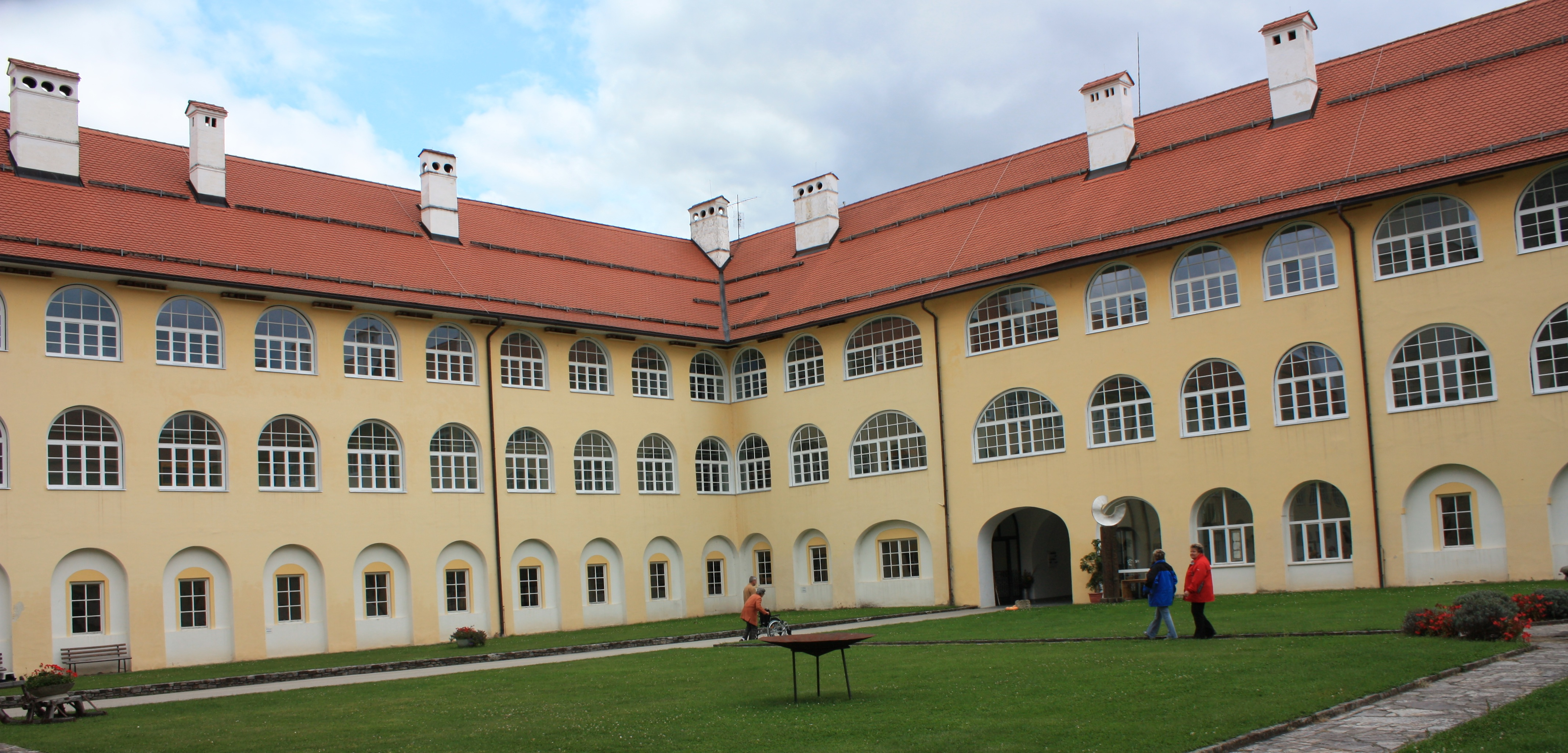
Southern Patio in Saint George's Abbey, Längsee

Carlone converted Saint George's Abbey, Längsee, into Baroque style in the years 1654–1658, with the exception of the tower, which was built in 1676.

=== Parish Church of St. Magdalena in Tragöss (1658) ===
In 1658, Pietro Francesco Carlone built the choir and side chapels of the parish church of St. Magdalena in Tragöß-Oberort in Bruck an der Mur. He had given an estimate for the work in 1640.

=== Seckau Abbey (1658–1679) ===
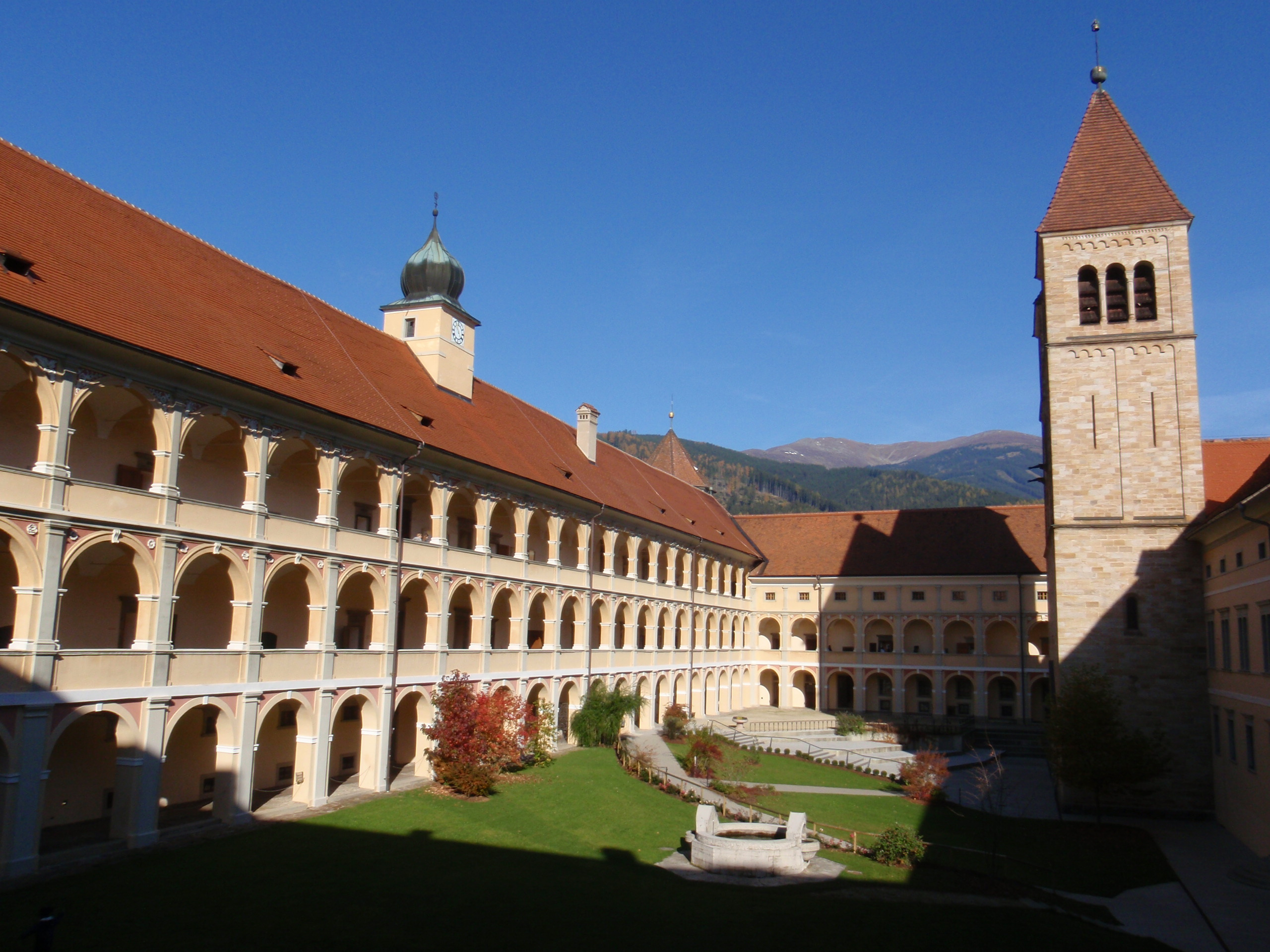
Seckau Abbey

Carlone was employed for a long period at Seckau Abbey. There he adopted the Baroque style for the expansion that had begun in 1625 on the western front. The Imperial Hall, completed in the year 1640, was decorated with rich stucco work in 1660 in preparation for a visit of the Emperor Leopold I. A year later the east, south and west wings were completed. The west facade and the towers of the Romanesque abbey church were transformed in the years 1671–1677. Carlone worked until 1679 at Seckau Abbey. That year he received compensation for his work over 18 years.

More than half of the buildings were demolished in 1832. The western façade and the towers were renovated in the 19th century in the Romanesque Revival style.

=== Abbey church in Garsten (from 1677) ===
The church of the former Benedictine monastery was based on a design by Carlone using the Jesuit church in Linz as a model. Designed and finished by his sons Carlo Antonio and Giovanni Battista, it was said to have one of the most magnificent interiors of the late Austro-Italian Baroque.

=== Abbey Church in Schlierbach (1680–1683) ===
The plans for the new church of the Cistercian Schlierbach Abbey were supplied by Carlone, and the work was executed by his son Carlo Antonio (according to other sources the two brothers shared the work.) Other members of the Carlone family, Giovanni Battista or Bartolomeo, created the stucco and frescoes in 1684–85. Carlo Antonio Carlone made the design for the altar.

== Attributed work ==
=== Francis Xavier Parish in Leoben (1660–1665) ===
The church, an impressive monument of the Counter-Reformation, is one of the early churches of Styria that uses the pilaster style later magnificently developed in the Carlone churches of the Frauenberg Sanctuary of Admont Abbey, Schlierbach and Garsten. It is assumed despite lack of archival evidence that this important building in Leoben dates back to Pietro Francesco Carlone, whose father had already settled in Leoben.

=== Old Cathedral in Linz (1678) ===
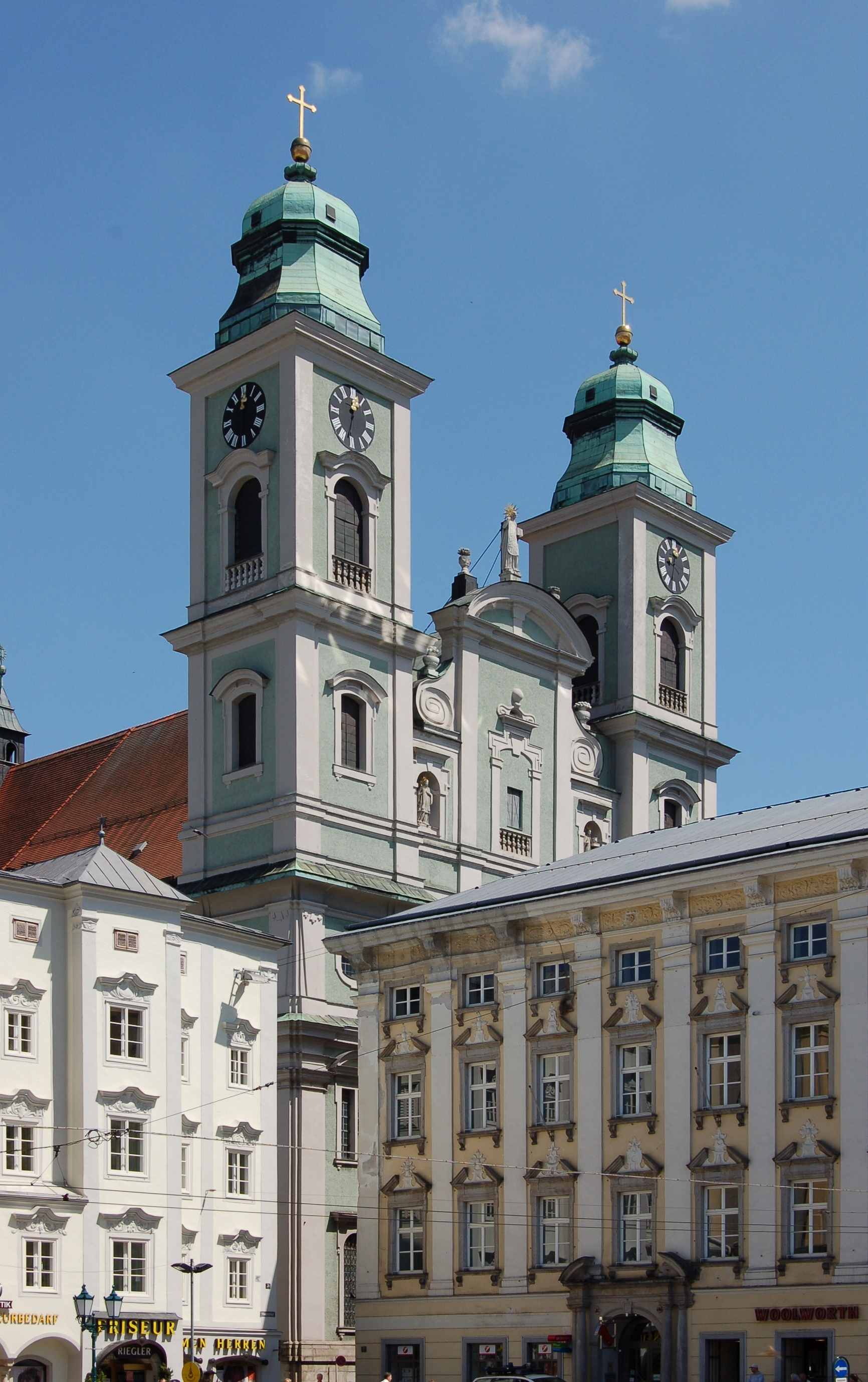
Old Cathedral, Linz, attributed to Carlone

The Jesuit church of St. Ignatius in Linz, known as the Old Cathedral, Linz, whose shell was completed in 1678, is also attributed to Pietro Francesco Carlone.

=== St. Michael's Church, Passau (1677) ===
St. Michael's Church, Passau was built after the fire in 1662 of the Church and Jesuit College. The new church was already completed in 1677. Pietro Francesco Carlone is considered the architect based on stylistic evidence. The interior has a simple pilaster layout. Parts of the building indicate stucco workers from the Carlone enterprise.
