= Göss Abbey =

Former abbey in Leoben, Austria

Coordinates: 47°21′47″N 15°05′45″E

- Reichsstift Göß
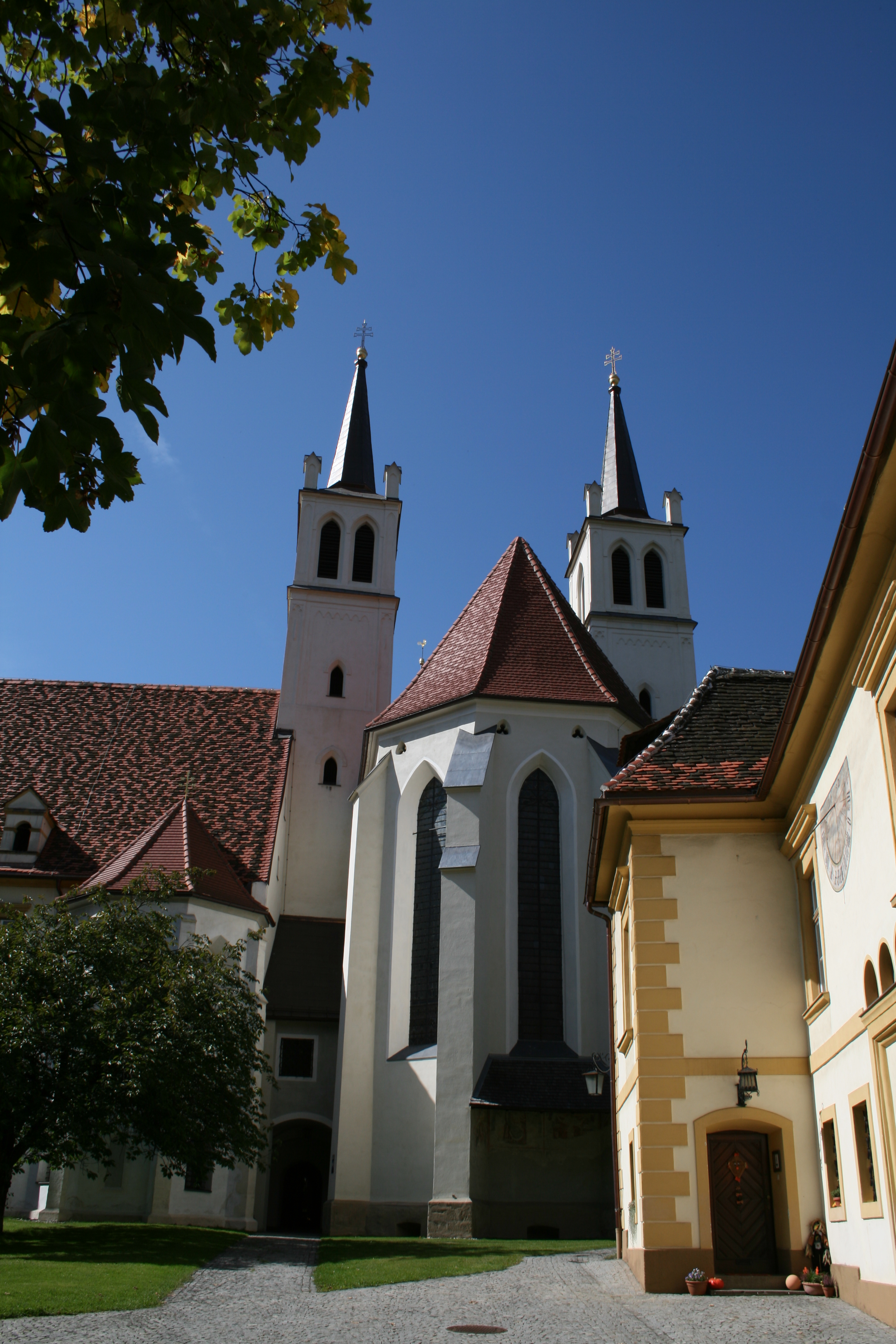
- Church of the former abbey
- Country: Austria
- Denomination: Catholic

Göss Abbey (German: Stift Göß) is a former Benedictine nunnery and former cathedral in Göss, now a part of Leoben in Styria, Austria. After the abbey's dissolution in 1782 the church, now a parish church, was the seat of the short-lived Bishopric of Leoben.

== History ==
The nunnery was founded in 1004 by Adula or Adela of Leoben, wife of Count Aribo I, and her son, also called Aribo, the future archbishop of Mainz, on the family's ancestral lands, and was settled by canonesses from Nonnberg Abbey in Salzburg. The first abbess was Kunigunde, sister of Archbishop Aribo. It was made an imperial abbey by Henry IV, Holy Roman Emperor, in 1020. The Benedictine Rule was introduced in the 12th century.

Göss Abbey functioned for centuries as a centre for the Styrian aristocracy to have their daughters educated and if necessary accommodated, and entry was strictly limited to members of the nobility.

The nunnery, the last remaining imperial abbey on Habsburg lands, was dissolved in 1782 in the course of the rationalist reforms of Joseph II, Holy Roman Emperor, and from 1786, served for a short time as the seat of the newly founded Bishopric of Leoben, of which the former abbey church, dedicated to Saint Mary and Saint Andrew, was the cathedral. The first and only bishop died in 1800, and from 1808, the diocese was administered by the Bishops of Seckau until it was formally abolished in 1859. In 1827 the premises were auctioned off and acquired by the wheelwrights' co-operative of Vordernberg, who were primarily interested in the forests of the former abbey's estates. In 1860 the buildings were acquired by a brewer from Graz (the nunnery had had its own brewer since 1459) and have since then been used as a brewery, the Brauerei Göß.

== Buildings and contents ==
The former abbey church, briefly the cathedral of Leoben, is now used as a parish church. It is a large late Gothic building containing an early Romanesque crypt beneath the choir, some important early Gothic frescoes in the chapel of Saint Michael in the Zackenstil or "zigzag style", and an imposing roof. The famous Göss chasuble (Gößer Ornat), a valuable piece of Romanesque silk embroidery, is now preserved in the Museum für angewandte Kunst in Vienna.

Now lost are the former parish church, the graveyard and the buildings formerly to the west of the abbey church. The Brunnhöfl ("fountain courtyard"), still largely extant, is well known.

A curiosity on display in the premises is a rare specimen of a reusable coffin of 1784 with an opening bottom that deposited the bodies inside into a common grave. A product of Josephine rationalism, the intention was to save local authorities the expense of coffins in pauper funerals, but it was a deeply unpopular measure and the coffins were withdrawn after only a few months.

== Abbesses of Göss ==
- Kunigund I, 1020–1027
- Wilburgis, 1040
- Richardis, 1066
- Margaretha, sometime in the 2nd half of the 11th century
- Hemma, sometime between 1100 and 1146
- Adelheid of Spanheim, 1146–1177
- Ottilie I of Guttenberg, 1188–1203
- Ottilie II, 1203–1230
- Kunigund II, 1239–1269
- Herburgis von Ehrenfels, 1271–1283
- Euphemia, 1283–1298
- Herradis von Breitenfurt, 1298–1322
- Berta von Pux und Pranckh, 1322–1338
- Diemut, 1340–1349
- Katharina von Strettweg, 1349–1354
- Gertraut von Hannau, 1355–1372
- Katharina von Truthan, 1381–1398
- Aloisia von Herberstorf, 1399–1421
- Gertrud von Helfenberg, 1421–1428
- Anna von Herberstorf, 1428–1463
- Bennigna Grassler, 1470–1474
- Ursula von Silberberg, 1474–1497
- Margaretha von Harbach, 1497–1505
- Veronika von Ratmanstorf, 1505–1514
- Margaretha von Mindorf, 1514–1523
- Barbara von Spangstein, 1523–1543
- Amalia von Leisser, 1543–1566
- Barbara von Liechtenstein, 1566–1573
- Anna von Harrach, 1573–1576
- Florientina von Putterer, 1576–1602
- Regina von Schrattenbach, 1602–1611
- Margaretha von Kuenburg, 1611–1640
- Maria Johanna von Kollonitsch, 1640–1657
- Maria Benedikta von Schrattenbach, 1657–1695
- Katharina Benedikta von Stürgkh, 1695–1706
- Maria Mechthildis von Berchthold, 1706–1737
- Maria Antonia von Überacker, 1737–1751
- Maria Henrica von Poppen, 1751–1779
- Maria Gabriela von Schaffmann, 1779–1782
