= Berthold of Garsten =

Austrian abbot (1060–1142)

Saint Berthold of Garsten, O.S.B.
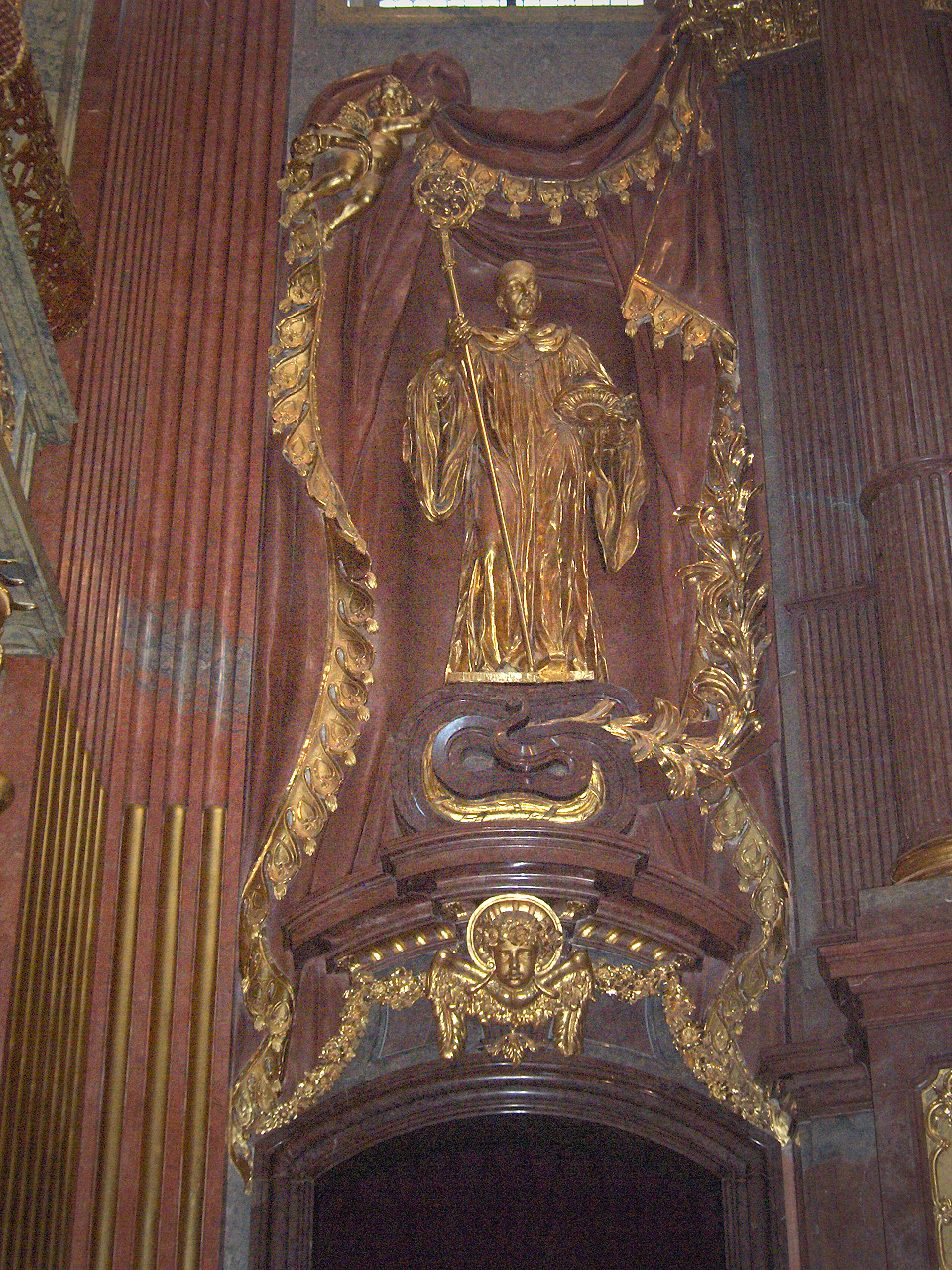
- Statue of St. Berthold at Melk Abbey.

Monk and priest
- Born: c. 1060; Duchy of Bavaria, Holy Roman Empire
- Died: 27 July 1142 (aged 82); Garsten, March of Styria, Duchy of Bavaria, Holy Roman Empire
- Venerated in: Roman Catholic Church (Austria & the Austrian Congregation of the Benedictine Order)
- Canonized: Equipollent canonization; 8 January 1970, Vatican City by Pope Paul VI
- Major shrine: Garsten Abbey, Austria
- Feast: 27 July
- Attributes: Benedictine habit and crozier

Berthold of Garsten, also known as Berthold de Rachez (c. 1060 – 27 July 1142), was a German Roman Catholic priest and a monk of the Order of Saint Benedict. He was a noted abbot of a major monastic house in the region, and is revered for the holiness of his life by the Catholic Church.

== Life ==
Berthold de Ranchez was born around 1060 at Lake Constance in Austria. He presumably belonged to the family of the bailiffs of Regensburg and is believed to have been descended from the house of the Counts of Bogen, who traditionally also held the office of Advocatus (Domvogt) of the Regensburg Cathedral. One version of his biography states that he married, but after a short marriage his wife died and he became a widower at the age of thirty. He immediately joined the Benedictines (Ordo Sancti Benedicti - OSB) in Sankt Blasien in the Black Forest. Another version says that he entered this monastery at a very young age and does not mention any marriage.

He became a librarian and in 1094 subprior in Sankt Blasien. His time at Sankt Blasien was very important, as it brought him into contact with the Cluniac reform, which had made only sporadic progress in the German Empire.

In 1107 he was called by Abbot Hartmann of Göttweig Abbey to become the new prior. The following year, Margrave Ottokar II of Styria entrusted Berthold with the development of Garsten Abbey, which Ottokar had founded in 1082 but was in the process of transforming from a community of secular canons to a monastic one, living under the Rule of Saint Benedict. Berthold soon established a rigorous discipline and reform along Cluniac lines.

Initially under the rule of Göttweig Abbey, the new community was declared independent in 1111, and Berthold was installed as the new community's first abbot. In this post he distinguished himself by his piety, kindness to all who approached him for help or counsel, devotion to his pastoral duties and organizational talent. In Garsten he founded a hospice for guests and a hospital for the poor, and his kindness to the poor and pilgrims became a strain on the resources of the young monastery which led to stories of how God miraculously intervened to keep it operating. Berthold had a reputation as a prophet and miracle worker. According to legend, when there was insufficient fish for meals on feast days, by his blessing enough was found to be provided.

With skillful administration, he increased the monastery's properties, thanks to gifts and testamentary gifts from private individuals. He introduced the Hirsau Reforms of monastic life into Austria.

Berthold had a reputation for living a private life of severe penance, never eating meat or fish and spending most of his nights in prayer. His advice was sought by the many visitors who came to the monastery to hear him preach, and he had a reputation as a wise advisor. He was Emperor Conrad III's confessor.

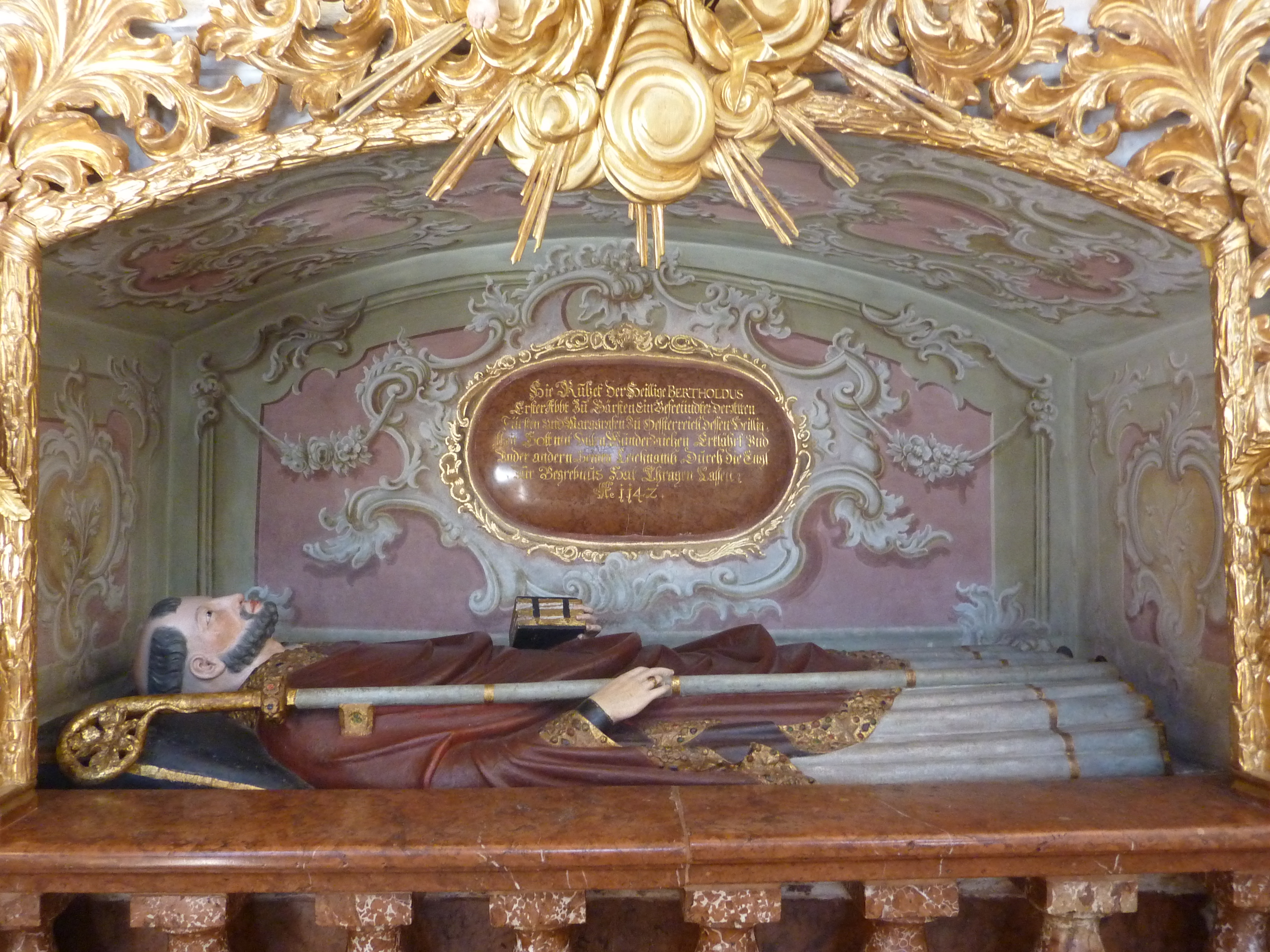
Tomb.

Berthold died late in the evening of 27 July 1142 and was buried in the abbey church at Garsten, which soon became a place of pilgrimage.In 1686 his relics were transferred to a separate chapel.

== Veneration ==
In 1236, the bishop of Passau allowed Berthold to be inscribed in the register of saints for July 27th. The cause for his beatification was officially opened on 3 May 1952. Pope Paul VI officially recognized Berthold's cultus on 8 January 1970. Berthold is listed in the Martyrologium Romanum.

Berthold is often depicted in a monk's habit with a fish. His feast day is celebrated by the Diocese of Linz as well as the Diocese of St. Pölten and the Archdiocese of Salzburg on 27 July.

== Sources ==
- Lenzenweger, J., 1958. Berthold von Garsten (with the Vita Bertholdi)
