= Catholic Church sexual abuse cases in Austria =

The sexual abuse scandal in Austria is a major chapter in the series of Catholic sex abuse cases in various Western jurisdictions.

== Cardinal Groër ==
Cardinal Hans Hermann Groër was removed as Archbishop of Vienna by John Paul II for alleged sexual misconduct. Officially, the Pope accepted the resignation letter which Groër had written on the occasion of his 75th birthday. This made Groër, who adamantly refused until his death to comment in public on the allegations, one of the highest-ranking Catholic clergymen to be involved in the sexual abuse scandals.

Upon request of the Holy See, Groër spent several months in Dresden and later retired to St. Joseph's Priory. Groër died in Sankt Pölten at age 83, and is buried in a Cistercian cemetery in Marienfeld, Austria.

== Seminary of Sankt Pölten ==
Bishop Kurt Krenn resigned from his post (see of Sankt Pölten, a suffragan of Vienna) in 2004 after there was a scandal concerning child pornography allegedly being downloaded by a student at the seminary. Up to 40,000 photos and an undisclosed number of films, including child pornography, were found on the computer of one of the seminarians, but Krenn earlier angered many by calling the images a "childish prank".

John Paul II ordered an investigation into the allegations, and Krenn voluntarily resigned from the post.

== Public reaction ==
In 2004, Church leaders declared that a number of Austrian laypeople had left the Catholic Church as a consequence of the scandal.

== See also ==
- Charter for the Protection of Children and Young People
- Child sexual abuse
- Essential Norms
- National Review Board
- Pontifical Commission for the Protection of Minors
- Religious abuse
- Sexual abuse
- Sexual misconduct
