= Gut Aich Priory =

Benedictine monastery in St. Gilgen, Austria

Coordinates: 47°46′36″N 13°23′04″E

Gut Aich Priory (Kloster Gut Aich) is a Benedictine monastery in St. Gilgen in Austria.

It was founded in 1993 and was formally recognised as an independent monastery on 11 July 2004 by the Presiding Abbot of the Austrian Congregation of the Benedictine Confederation, of which it is a member.

A special task of the priory is to contribute to the peaceful coexistence of people and nations in Europe, and for that reason it describes itself as a "European abbey" ("Europakloster").
