= David Gregor Corner =

German abbot, hymn writer and theologian

David Gregor Corner (1585 – 9 January 1648) was a German Benedictine abbot, hymn writer and theologian best known for his influential 1631 Gross Catholisches Gesängbuch ("Great Catholic Hymnal"). Born in Hirschberg, Germany (now Jelenia Góra, Poland), he studied theology at Prague, Graz and Vienna, where he earned a doctorate. He became a pastor in Retz in 1614. In 1628 he became a novice monk at Göttweig Abbey. By 1636, Corner was the abbot of Göttweig, where he became a leading figure of the Counter-Reformation, and was made Rector of the University of Vienna in 1638. He died 9 January 1648 at Göttweig.

His magnum opus, the Gross Catholische Gesängbuch was published in 1625, and a later publication from 1631 contained 546 hymns and 276 melodies (including 76 Latin hymns), one of the largest song books of the 16th and 17th century. This collection featured devotional Catholic hymns for use in church, church festivals and processions.

The collection was derived from a large variety of sources - earlier Jesuit hymn collections, manuscripts, and even Protestant writers. In the introduction to his work, he notes that he initially considered leaving out "all hymns found in heretical collections" but decided that they should be included after a colleague reminded him that many of the hymns of Martin Luther and other Protestant composers were derived from earlier Catholic melodies, and "it was in no way desirable to leave out such good old hymns...simply because they have been used by the enemies of the true faith and falsely ascribed to them."

A separate collection, Geistliche Nachtigal ("Holy Nightingale") was published in 1649, perhaps posthumously. This contained 363 hymns and 181 melodies (including 42 Latin hymns), and was essentially a retitled and revised version of his original collection. After his death, editions of Geistliche Nachtigal were published in 1658, 1674 and 1676.
