= Garsten Abbey =

Building in Upper Austria, Austria

Coordinates: 48°01′11″N 14°24′37″E

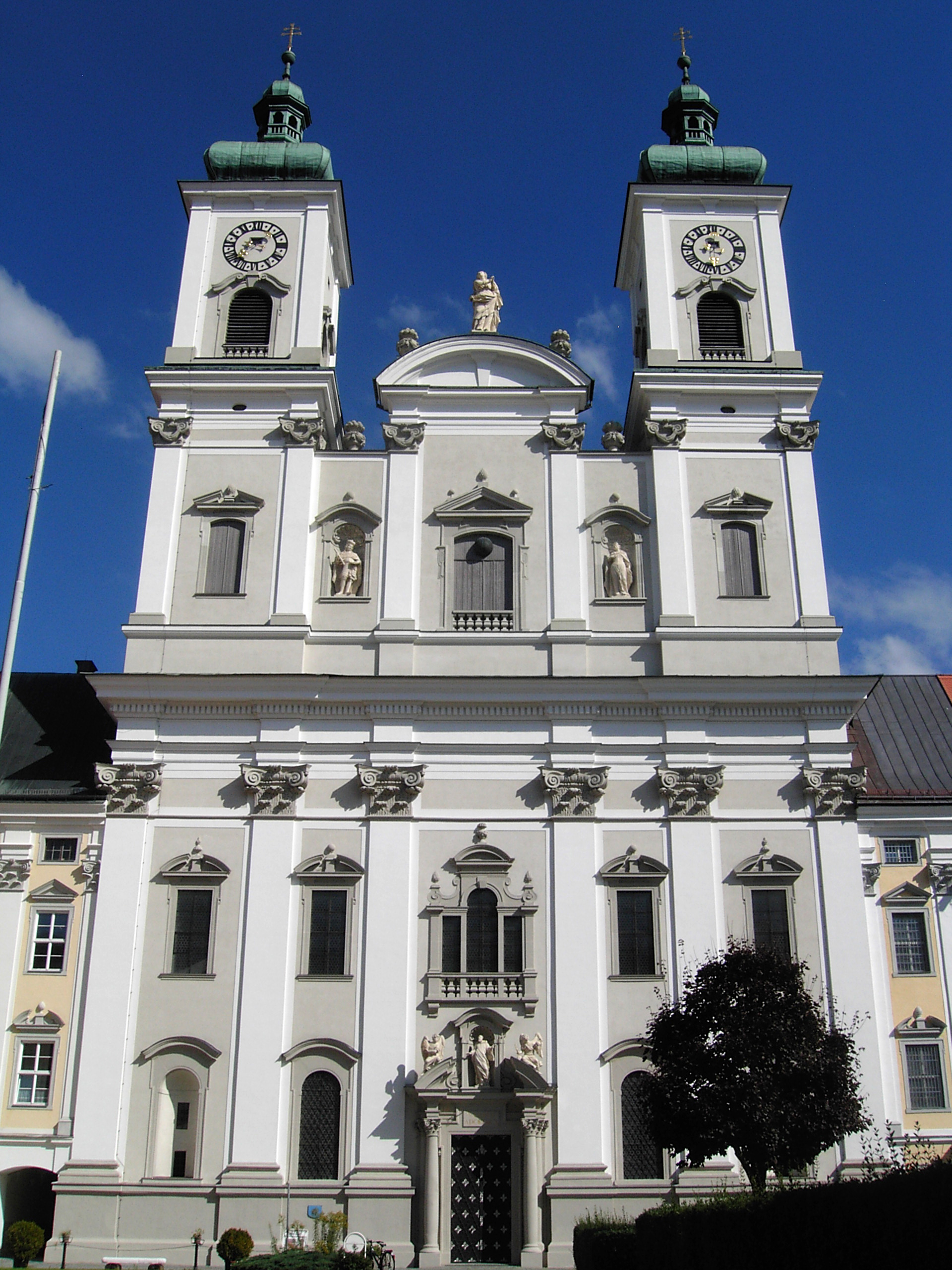
Garsten Abbey Church

Garsten Abbey (German: Stift Garsten) is a former Benedictine monastery located in Garsten near Steyr in Upper Austria. Since 1851, the former monastery buildings have accommodated a prison.

== History ==
The abbey was founded in 1080–1082 by Ottokar II of Styria as a community of secular canons and as a dynastic burial place for his family. Together with his fortress, the Styraburg (Schloss Lemberg), it served as a focal point of Ottokar as ruler of the Traungau, and was endowed with significant possessions in the Traisen and Gölsen valleys, in Lower Austria, probably from the dowry of Ottokar's wife Elisabeth, daughter of the Babenberger Leopold II of Austria.

In 1107–1108 the monastery was made a priory of the Benedictine Göttweig Abbey; and became an independent abbey in 1110–1111. Its first and greatest abbot was Blessed Berthold of Garsten (d. 1142), a champion of the Hirsau Reforms, who is buried in the abbey church, and who built the abbey up to such a level that for centuries it was the religious, spiritual and cultural centre of the Eisenwurzen region. Monks from Garsten settled Gleink Abbey in the 1120s.

From 1625 Garsten Abbey was a member of the Benedictine Austrian Congregation.

In 1787 it was dissolved by Emperor Joseph II.

== Abbey church ==
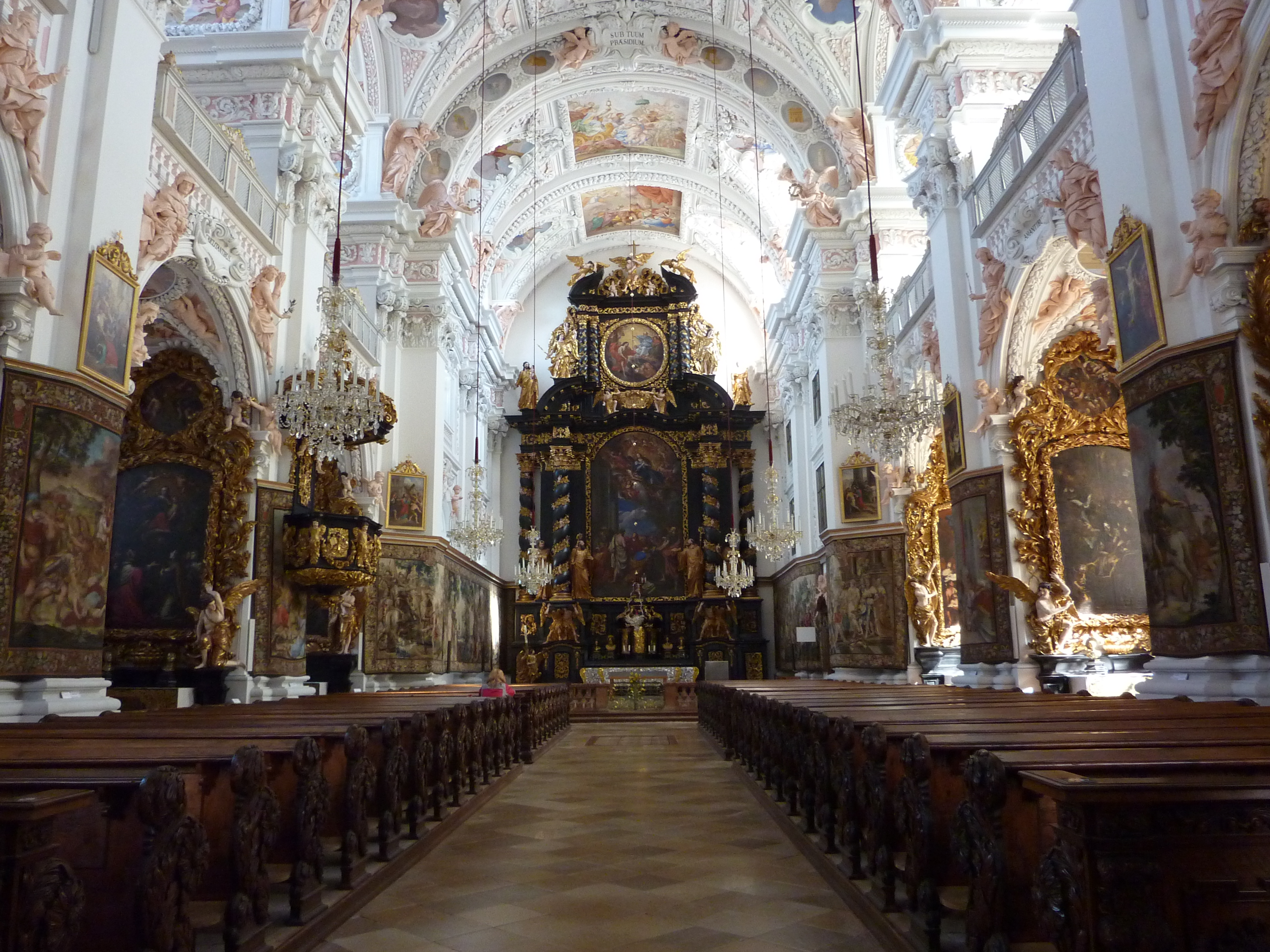
Garsten Abbey church - interior

The abbey church still survives as a parish church. It was built by the Carlone family of master builders and is considered one of the most beautiful examples of High Baroque architecture in Austria. The church was designed by Pietro Francesco Carlone using the Jesuit church in Linz as a model, and finished by his sons Carlo Antonio Carlone and Giovanni Battista, it was said to have one of the most magnificent interiors of the late Austro-Italian Baroque.

Particularly notable are the stucco work and the Dutch tapestries. The Losenstein chapel, the sacristy and the summer choir are also of special interest.

A Christmas market is held in the "Am Platzl" Square in front of the abbey church in late November and early December.

== Theatre ==
Garsten, like several other Benedictine monasteries in Austria, contained a theatre. It was dismantled and moved to Steyr in 1789, where it was reassembled in the former church of the Celestine nuns, whose community had also been dissolved, as the town theatre, which operated until 1958. The building, still known as the Altes Stadttheater, is now a music school.

== Prison ==
Since 1850 the former monastery buildings have accommodated a prison, Justizanstalt Garsten. This is one of the few prisons in Austria where life sentences are carried out. Austrian incest-rapist Josef Fritzl is serving his sentence there.
