= St. Vitus' Abbey on the Rott =

Benedictine abbey in Bavaria

Coordinates: 48°21′32″N 12°31′02″E

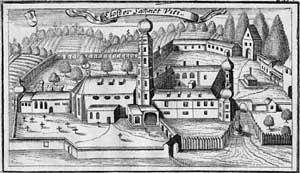
Engraving of St. Vitus' Abbey from the "Churbaierische Atlas" of Anton Wilhelm Ertl, 1687

St. Vitus' Abbey, occasionally also St. Vitus' Abbey on the Rott (German: Kloster Sankt Veit; Kloster Sankt Veit an der Rott), was a Benedictine monastery in the municipality of Neumarkt-Sankt Veit in the district of Mühldorf in Bavaria, Germany.

It was founded in 1121 by the nobleman Dietmar of Lungau, and dissolved during the secularisation of Bavaria in 1802. Formerly in the diocese of Salzburg, the abbey was a member of the Benedictine Salzburg Congregation from 1641 until its dissolution.

The premises were given at first to the Damenstift of St. Anna in Munich, but in 1829 came into the possession of the Saxon Baron Maximilian von Speck-Sternburg and then in 1858 were sold to Count Maximilian von Montgelas.
