= Michaelbeuern Abbey =

Benedictine monastery in Dorfbeuern, Austria

Coordinates: 48°01′13″N 13°01′47″E

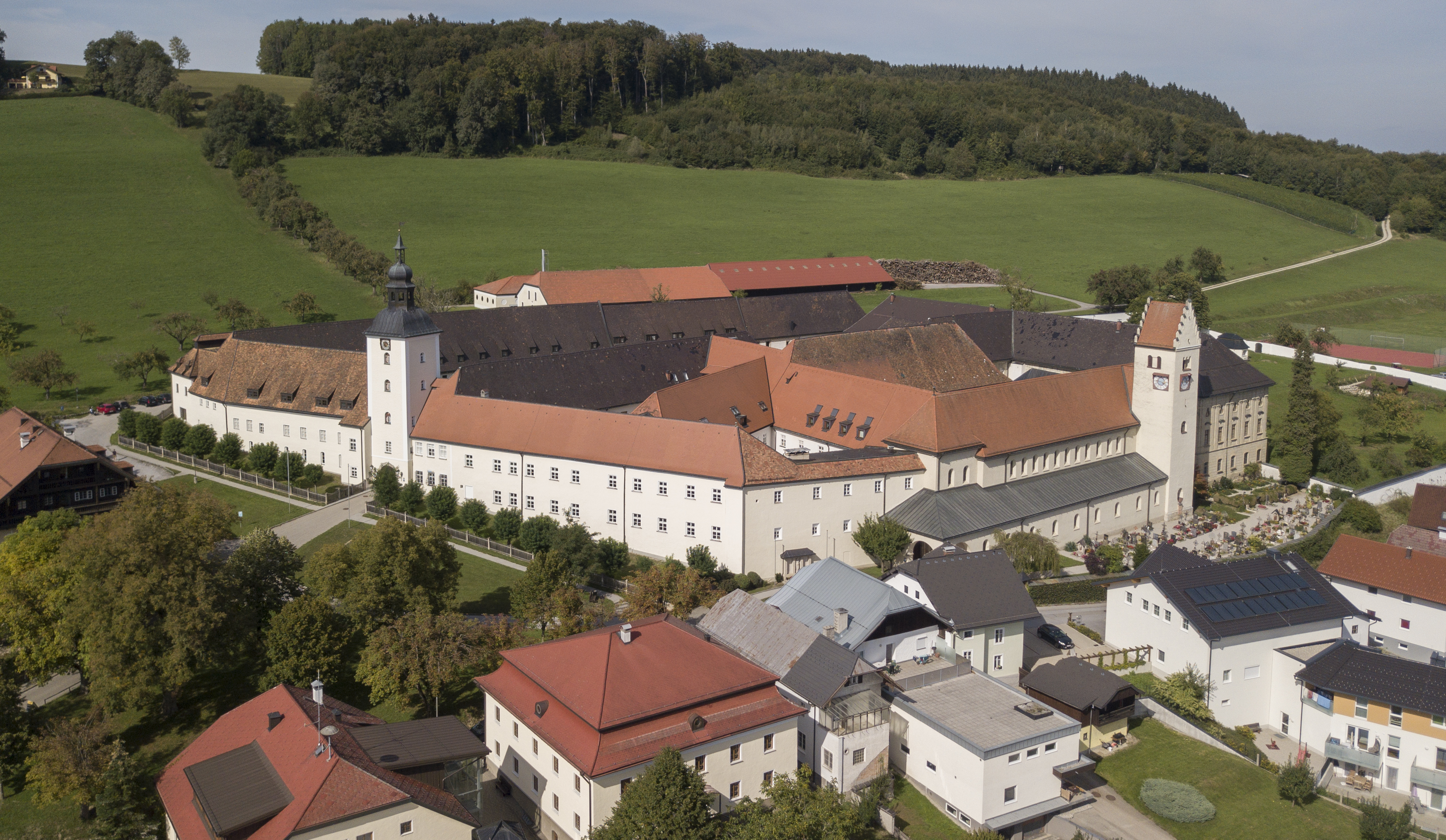
Michaelbeuern Abbey

Michaelbeuern Abbey (German: Abtei Michaelbeuern) is a Benedictine monastery in Dorfbeuern near Salzburg in Austria.

== History ==
A monastic cell existed here as early as 736 or thereabouts, referred to in the Aachen Monastery Register("Klosterverzeichnis") in 817 as "Buria". After the Hungarian wars, reconstruction began in 977 with an endowment from Emperor Otto II. More times of crisis came upon the abbey with the fire of 1346, mismanagement of the prebendal income and the effects of the Reformation.

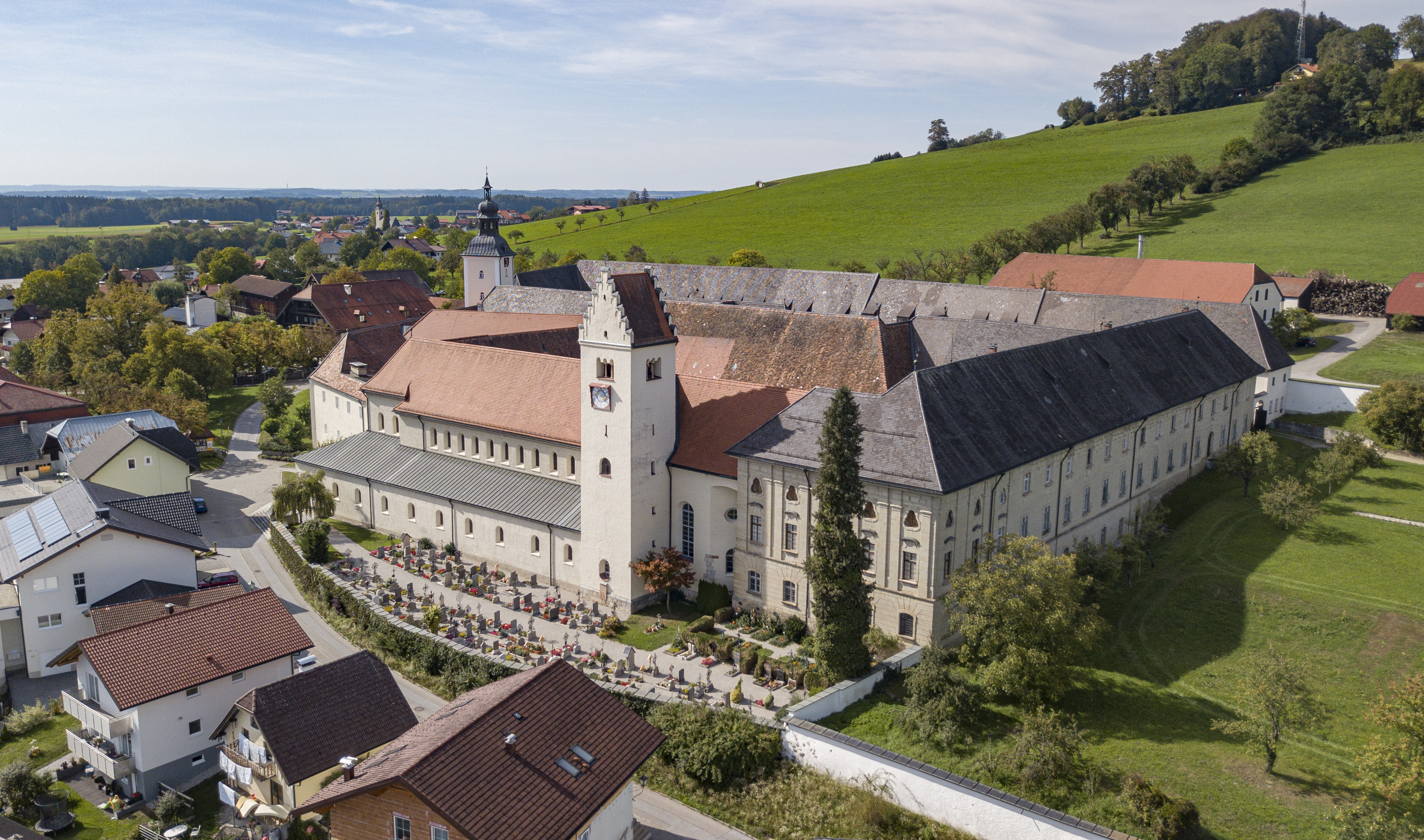
Michaelbeuern Abbey

From the 17th century however Michaelbeuern began a long period of prosperity, which led to ambitious building works, for example the Baroque high altar of 1691 in the abbey church, by Meinrad Guggenbichler and Johann Michael Rottmayr. At this time more than twenty-five monks of Michaelbeuern gained their doctorates at the Benedictine University of Salzburg. The community also took on many pastoral responsibilities in the surrounding parishes. During the National Socialist period the monks were expelled, but returned after World War II. The abbey church, re-romanised, was re-dedicated in 1950.

From 1641 the abbey was a member of the Salzburg Congregation, which in 1930 was merged into the present Austrian Congregation of the Benedictine Confederation.

== The abbey today ==
The abbey today is a thriving Benedictine community, well known as an educational and cultural centre. The abbey runs a school and owns different business like a farm, a district heating plant, a biogas plant and a participation in a brewery (Augustiner Bräu Kloster Mülln). Cultural offerings include the Baroque cloister, medieval refectory, and high altar in the church. The abbey houses a rich manuscript collection, a notable music archive, and hosts various concerts. It actively preserves and presents Christian art within the monastic community. The present abbot is Johannes Perkmann who was elected in 2006.

== Church ==
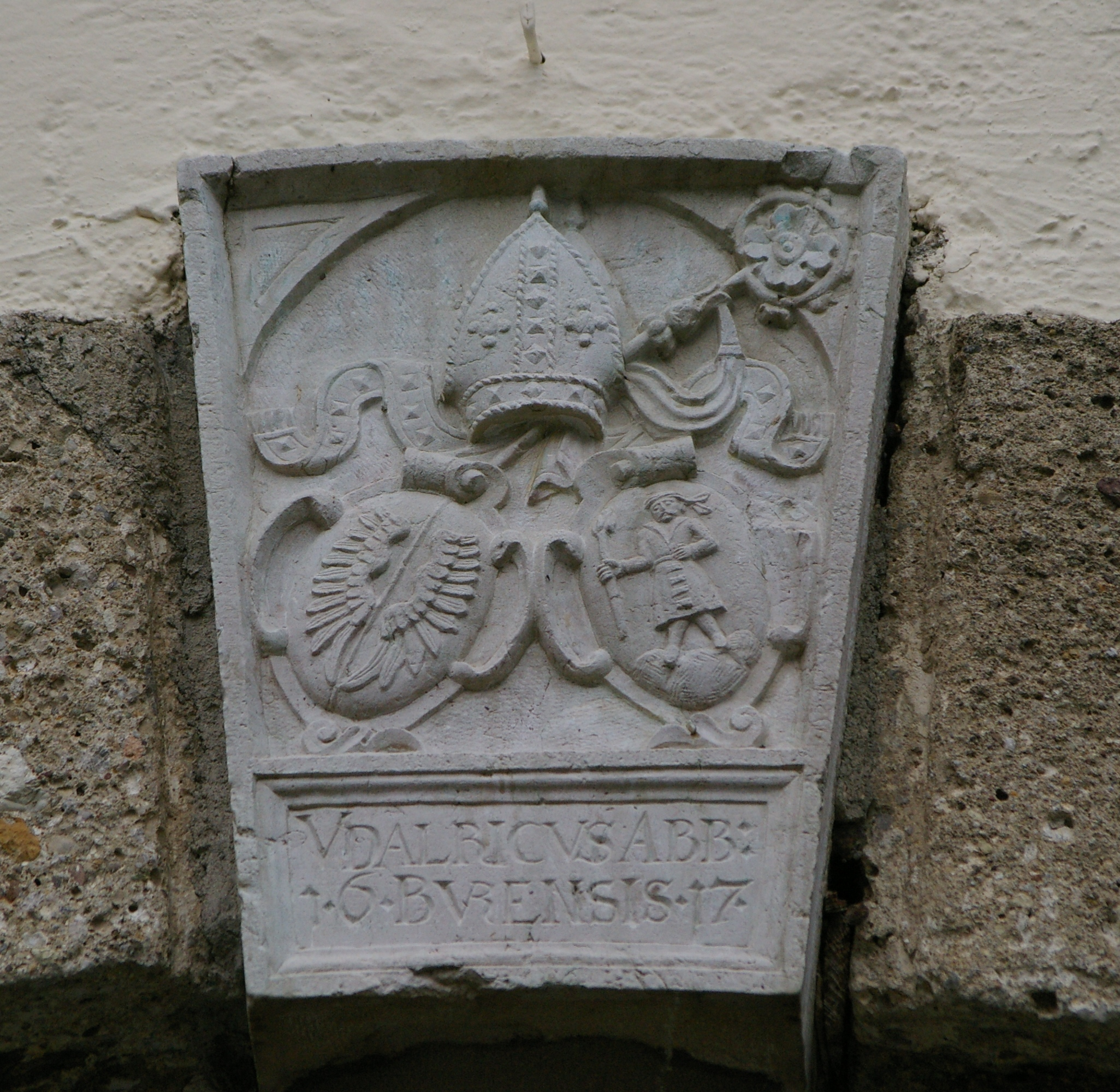
Coat of Arms above the main entrance

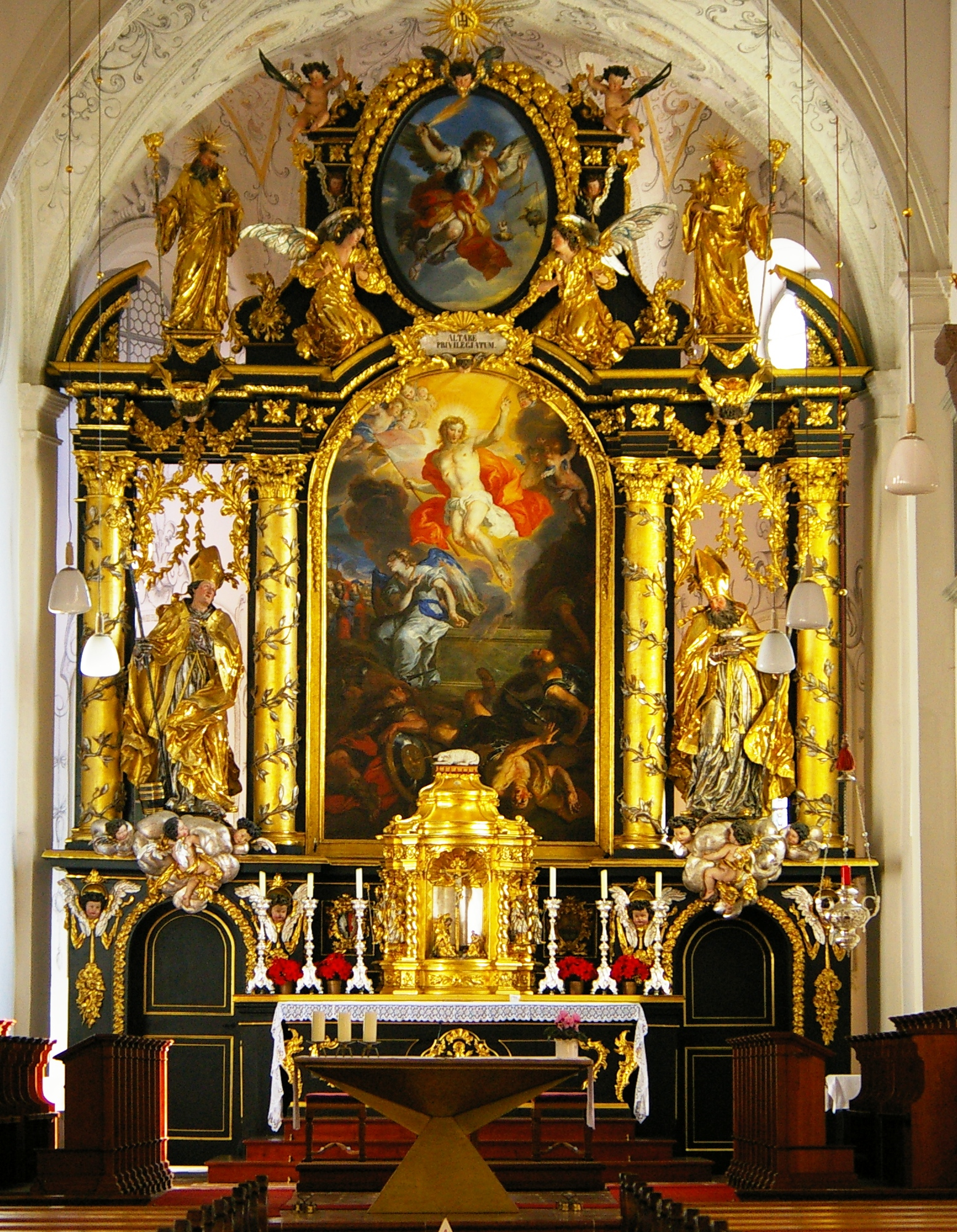
Abbey church high altar by Meinrad Guggenbichler and Johann Michael Rottmayr

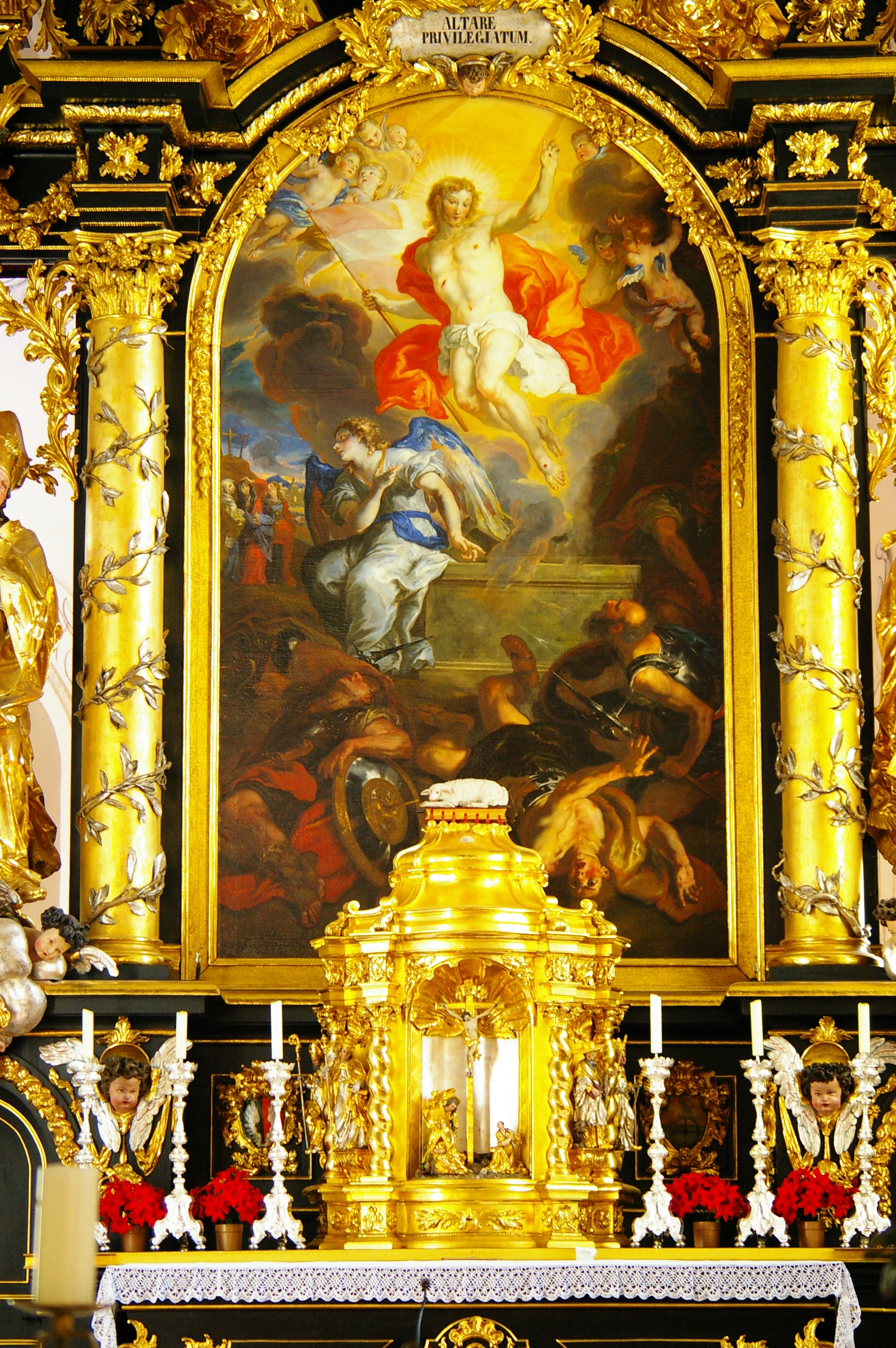
Painting by Johann Michael Rottmayr

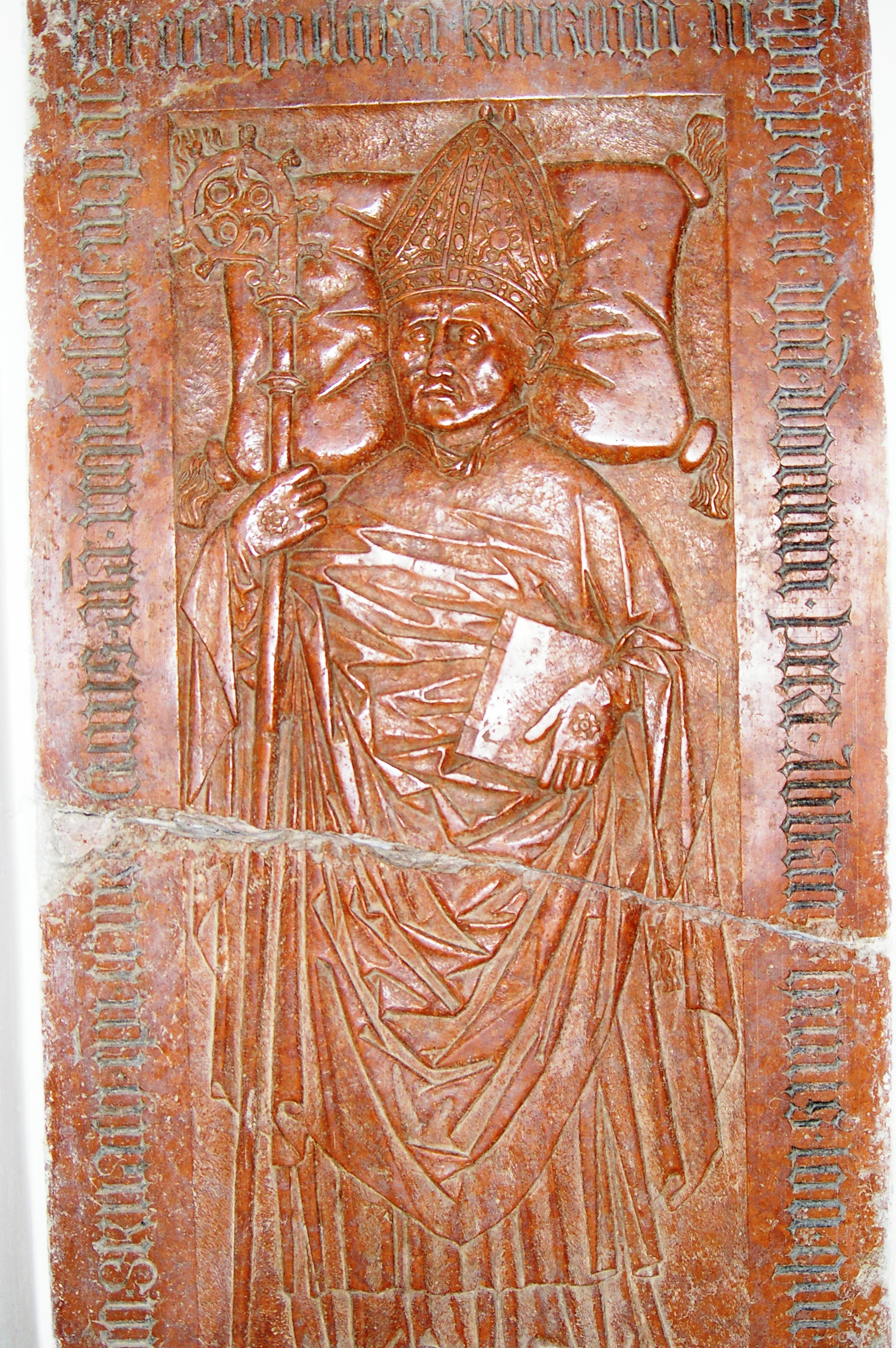
Gravesite of Ulrich Hofbauer
