= Gleinkersee =

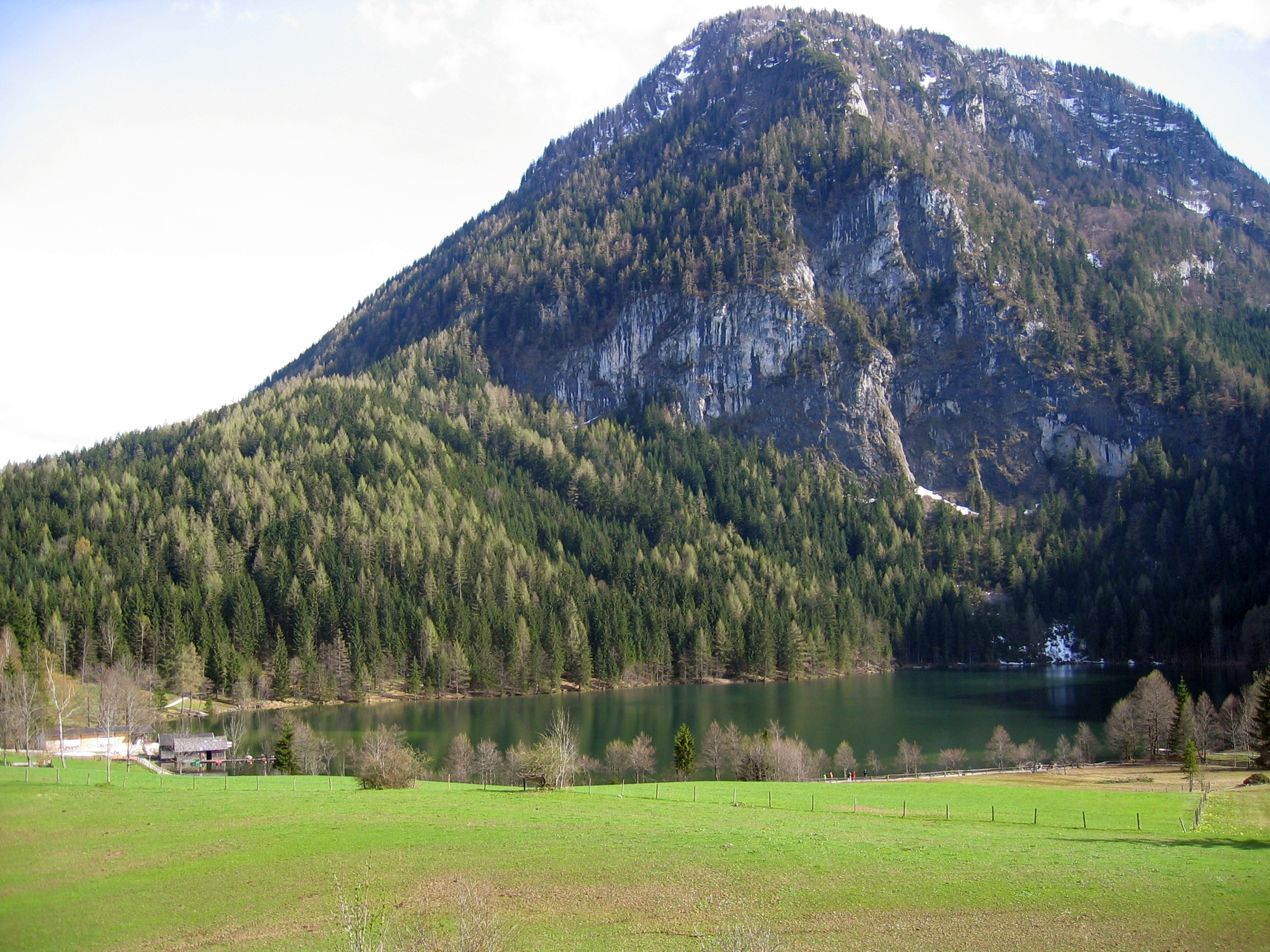
- Gleinkersee with Seespitz

- Position of Gleinkersee in Austria
- Location: Upper Austria
- Coordinates: 47°41′N 14°18′E
- Type: glacial lake
- Primary inflows: Seebach, subterranean Karst wells
- Primary outflows: Seebach → Teichl → Steyr → Enns → Danube
- Basin countries: Austria
- Max. length: 0.570 km (0.354 mi)
- Max. width: 0.320 km (0.199 mi)
- Surface area: 13 ha (32 acres)
- Max. depth: 0.120 mi (0.193 km)
- Water volume: 1.59 km^{3} (0.38 cu mi)
- Surface elevation: 806 m (2,644 ft)
- References: Lake profile

Gleinkersee (Lake Gleink) is a mountain lake in Upper Austria located in the municipality of Spital am Pyhrn, north of the mountain area Totes Gebirge. Its elevation is 806 m (2,644 ft) above sea level of the Adriatic Sea. The name refers to the former owner of the lake, Gleink Abbey near Steyr.

== Geography ==
Gleinkersee is situated in the Windischgarstner basin, 2 km (1.2 mi) southeast of the town center of Rossleithen. It is accessible via state road L1316 (Gleinkerseestraße) to a restaurant at the north shore.

The lake, extending approximately from south to north, is 570 m (1,870 ft) long and up to 320 m (1,050 ft) wide. The banks are rocky and steeply sloping. Only at the northern shore around the outlet via the Seebach it contains a narrow muddy strip in front of a shallow meadow bank.

Gleinkersee is surrounded by Seespitz mountain (1,574 m [5,164 ft] above sea level) in the southeast and by the east walls of Präwald mountain (1,227 m [4,026 ft] above sea level) in the southwest.

== Geology ==
During the ice ages, a glacier flowing from the cirques at the north slope of the Totes Gebirge formed the Gleinkersee's basin. Below the steep rock walls, which are made up of solid Dachstein limestone, there is soft marl (flysch rock) which was excavated by the ice. The glacier's end moraine is visible in the area of the Gasthof Seebauer. It has been ground open at the intersection of the parking lot. Only after the lake was formed, the deep, rift-shaped falling-in took place in the cavernous Dachstein limestone. Had the chasm formed at the time of the glaciation, it would have been filled with debris from the ground moraine.

== History ==
From 1125 on, Gleinkersee was owned by Gleink Abbey. Due to the great distance of 64 km (40 mi) from the abbey to the lake, it was let out for 20 years to the Spital am Pyhrn Abbey in 1589 for the price of 200 guilders. In 1608 it was permanently ceded for another payment of 200 guilders.

== Tourism ==
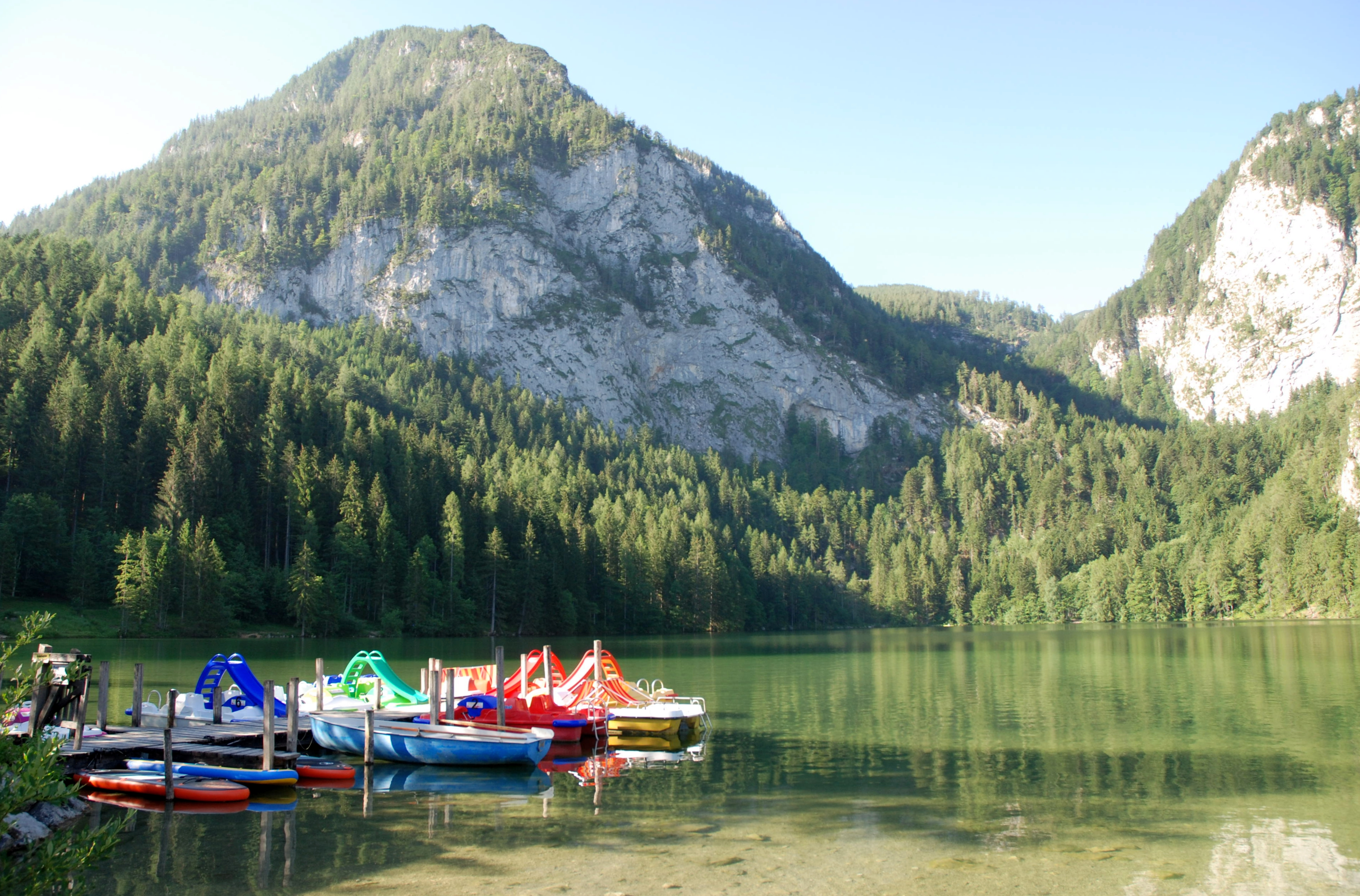
Jetty on Gleinkersee's north shore. In the background Seespitz with the lake ditch

Gleinkersee ist a popular day trip destination for hiking, due to the scenic views of Totes Gebirge and Nationalpark Kalkalpen. Facilities at the north shore include Gasthof Seebauer, an inn, a camping site, two ropes courses and a rental for boats and paddle boards. The weak water movement and the location sheltered from wind enable rapid warming of the upper water layers. Therefore, the local tourism office describes Gleinkersee as one of the warmest bathing lakes in Austria. Bathing jetties and a sunbathing lawn are located on the shore.

== A Legend ==
The sinkhole of 120 metres (390 ft) in Gleinkersee is the subject of a folk tale probably referring to the War of the Second Coalition (1797-1801):

"At the time of the French wars, the clergy of the former Spital am Pyhrn monastery came under severe pressure from the enemy. In order to secure the treasures of the monastery, they sank a barrel filled with gold into the Gleinkersee. When quiet times returned, they wanted to retrieve the treasure. To their horror, however, they noticed that the bottom of the lake was no longer accessible at the point where they had lowered the barrel.”
