= Dorfbeuern =

Dorfbeuern Dorfbeian
- Municipality
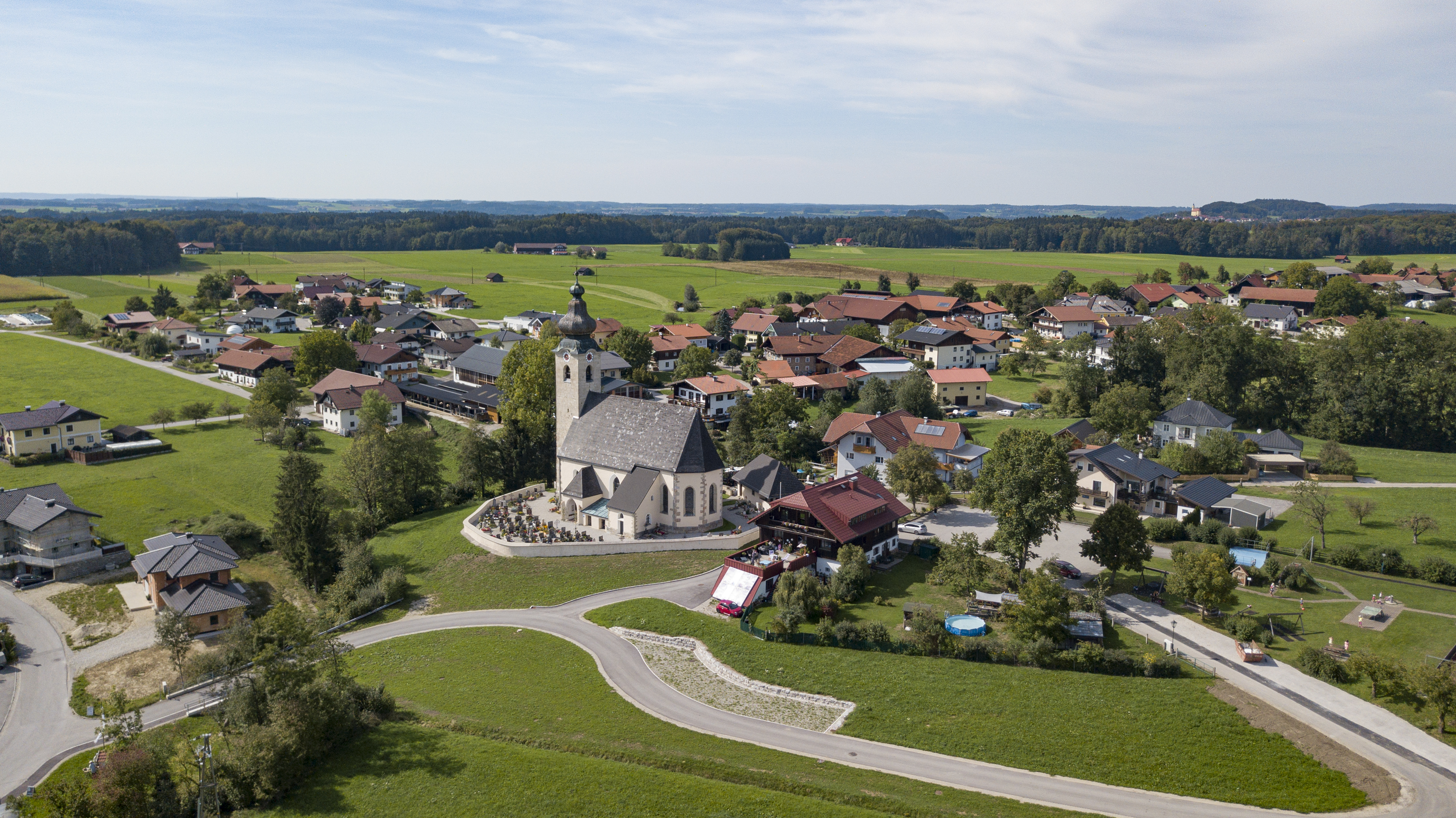

- Flag Coat of arms

- Location within Austria
- Coordinates: 48°01′00″N 13°01′00″E
- Country: Austria
- State: Salzburg
- District: Salzburg-Umgebung

Government
  - Mayor: Adolf Hinterhauser (ÖVP)

Area
  - Total: 14.6 km^{2} (5.6 sq mi)
- Elevation: 471 m (1,545 ft)

Population (2018-01-01)
  - Total: 1,547
  - Density: 106/km^{2} (274/sq mi)
- Time zone: UTC+1 (CET)
  - Summer (DST): UTC+2 (CEST)
- Postal code: 5152
- Area code: 06274
- Vehicle registration: SL
- Website: www.dorfbeuern.salzburg.at

Dorfbeuern (Central Bavarian: Dorfbeian) is a municipality in the district of Salzburg-Umgebung in the state of Salzburg in Austria.

== Geography ==
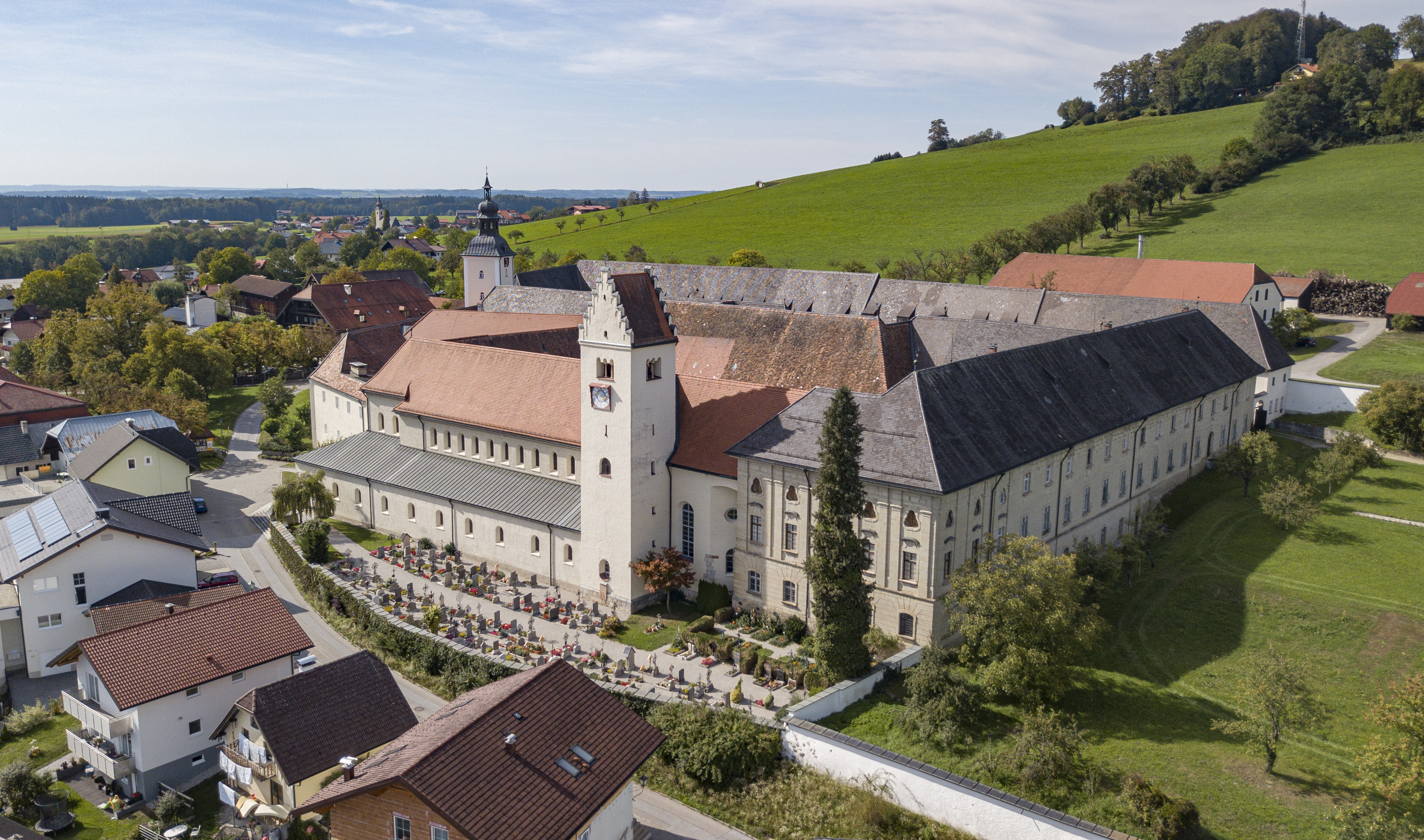
Michaelbeuern Abbey

Dorfbeuern is situated in the district Salzburg-Umgebung, 30 km north of Salzburg on the boundary with Upper Austria.

The municipality consist of Dorfbeuern, Michaelbeuern and Vorau and some small hamlets.

== Sights ==
The economic and cultural center of Dorfbeuern is Michaelbeuern Abbey, a Benedictine Abbey founded in the 8th century. The Abbey runs a school for pupils from 10 to 14 years (Hauptschule) following a tradition going back to the 13th century, when a school in the abbey was first mentioned.

== Politics ==
The local council consists of 13 members, 10 from the conservative ÖVP and 3 from the SPÖ (Labour). The mayor of Dorfbeuern is Adolf Hinterhauser (ÖVP).
