= St. Joseph's Priory, Maria Roggendorf =

Priory in Hollabrunn, Austria

Coordinates: 48°37′07″N 16°08′11″E

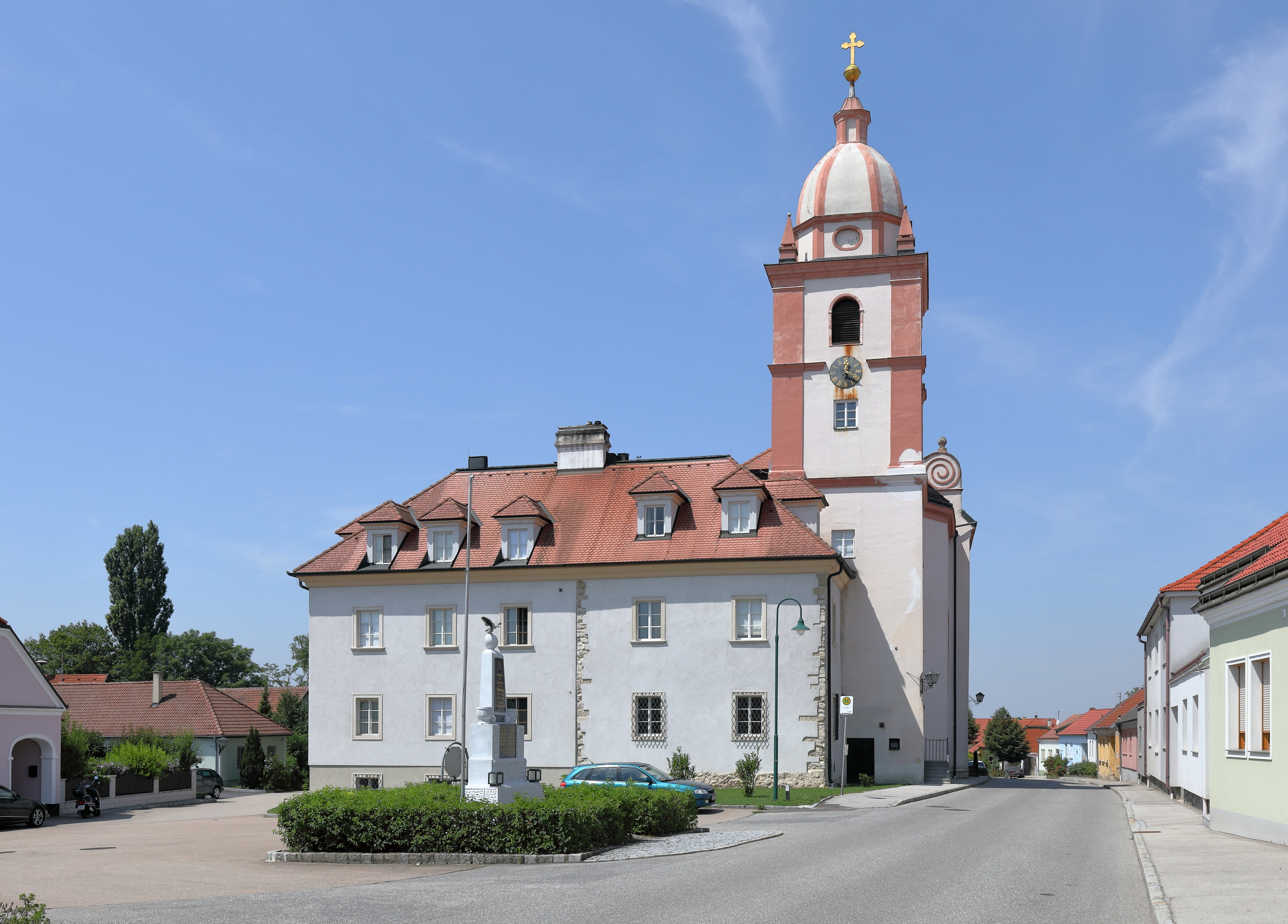
Center of Maria Roggendorf with St. Joseph's Priory

St. Joseph's Priory, Maria Roggendorf (German: Stift Sankt Josef, Maria Roggendorf) is a Benedictine priory located in the long-established pilgrimage centre of Maria Roggendorf in the district of Hollabrunn in Lower Austria.

It was founded on 7 September 1991 by Göttweig Abbey and recognised as an independent priory on 11 December 2005. It is a member of the Austrian Congregation of the Benedictine Confederation.
