= Gleink Abbey =

Former Benedictine monastery in Steyr, Austria (12c. - 1784)

Coordinates: 48°04′03″N 14°24′53″E

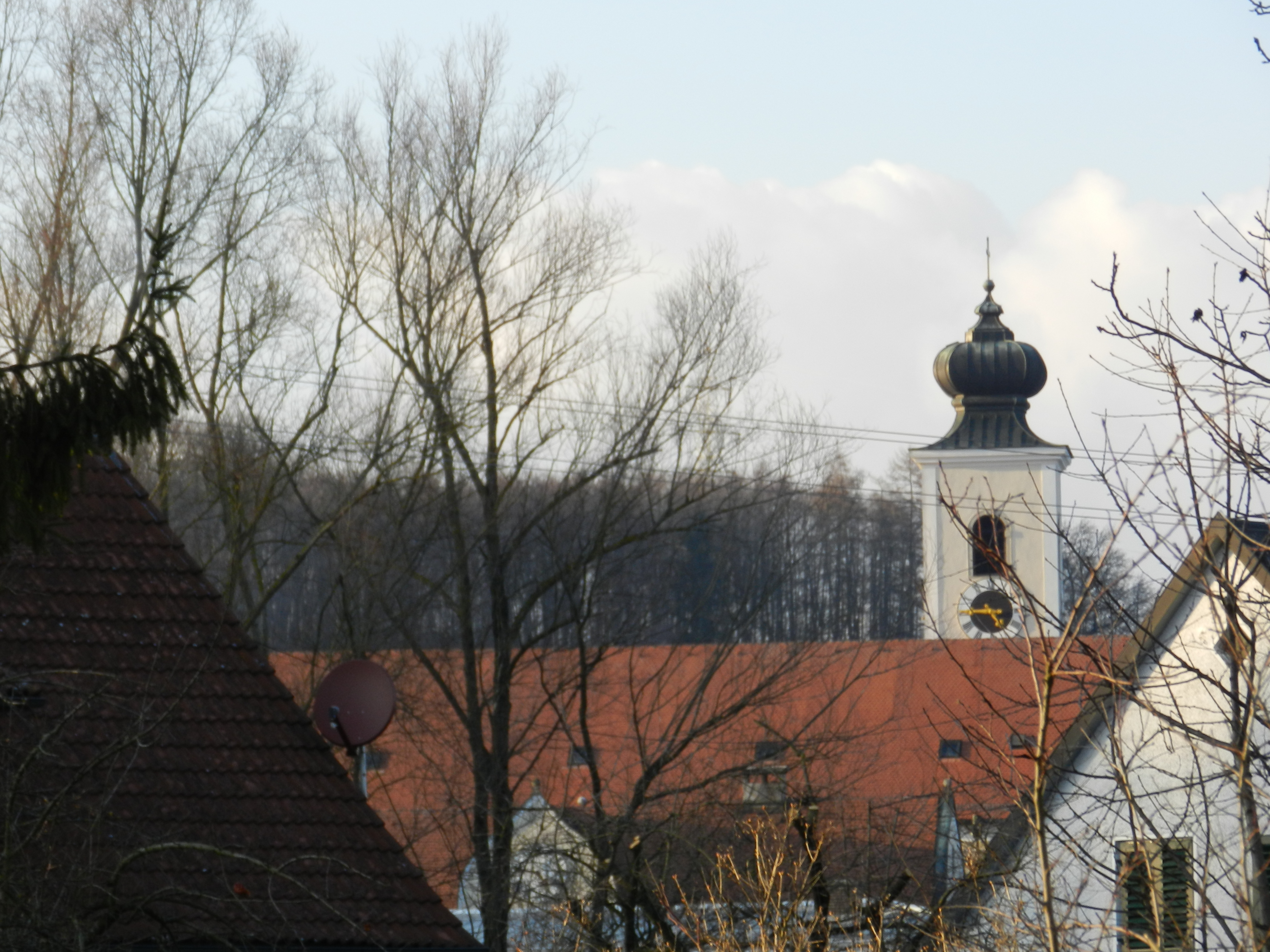
Abbey church from the south-east

Gleink Abbey (Stift or Kloster Gleink) was a Benedictine monastery located in the town of Steyr in Austria.

The monastery was founded in the early 12th century by Arnhalm I of Glunich with monks from Garsten Abbey. Upon its dissolution in 1784, the abbey church became the church for the parish. From 1832 to 1977, the monastery housed a girls' academy.

== Benedictine abbey ==
It was founded in the early 12th century, shortly after the foundation of Garsten Abbey, by the local nobleman, Arnhalm I of Glunich, who gave his castle for conversion to a monastery. The premises, dedicated to Saint Andrew, were ready for occupation in the 1120s.

Gleink was settled from Garsten Abbey, from where the first abbot, Ulrich, came. The family of the original founder, after running short of money, were obliged to pass the position of Vogt (lord protector) to Leopold the Strong, Margrave of Styria, who also issued the foundation charter in 1125 and endowed the abbey with property, notably around the present Gleinkersee. He then gave the abbey to Bishop Otto of Bamberg.

The abbey suffered fire damage in 1220, 1275 and 1313, but narrowly escaped destruction at the hands of the invading Hungarians in the late 15th century and the marauding Turks in 1532, although they caused devastation in the surrounding area. Later in the 16th century the Reformation and the spread of Lutheranism caused more difficulties. In 1561, Emperor Ferdinand wrote, in discussing the ecclesiastical situation in the archduchy of Upper and Lower Austria, "...the conventuals at Gleink were all married and lived in drunkenness and gluttony."

The trend began to reverse from 1575 with the appointment of Abbot Georg Andreas (1575–1585) from Niederaltaich Abbey. The abbey also suffered damage during the Thirty Years' War.

From the later 17th century however more favourable circumstances allowed the development and refurbishment of the premises in the Baroque style, principally associated at Gleink with Abbot Rupert II Freysauf von Neudegg (1709–1735). Abbot Wolfgang Hofmayr, well known as a preacher and a professor in the University of Salzburg, took office in 1762. He was the last abbot: the monastery was dissolved under Joseph II on 21 May 1784. The former monastery church became the a parish church and is dedicated to the Apostle Andreas.

From 1625 until its dissolution the abbey was a member of the Benedictine Austrian Congregation.

=== Library ===
The continuing difficulties faced by the abbey were reflected in the depleted state of its library, which in 1599 contained only 110 printed books and 150 manuscripts. However, in the relative prosperity of the period from the mid-17th century onwards, the library grew, acquiring among other things the manuscript of the Gleinker Weltchronik (see below). At the dissolution, the library contents were divided between the Studienbibliothek (now the Linz University Library) and the Linz Diocesan Library.

Perhaps the best-known item from the former abbey library is the illuminated manuscript known as the Gleinker Weltchronik, a history of the world based on the Bible. Produced in the mid-14th century, it contains an inscription placing it at Gleink in 1712. This manuscript is now Codex 472 of the Linz University Library.

== Convent of the Salesian Sisters ==
After a short period of use as a barracks, the buildings were given to the Bishop of Linz as a summer residence.

In 1832, at the invitation of the then bishop, Gregorius Thomas Ziegler, a community of Salesian Sisters from Vienna took up residence. The sisters turned the monastery into an academy for young women. The parish church served as the convent chapel. No new novices entered the community however after about 1950, and the convent was eventually closed in 1977.

== Missionaries of the Heart of Jesus ==
Since the dissolution the parochial duties had been carried out by parish priests, but from 1950 were undertaken by the Missionary Order of the Heart of Jesus, who settled and run a boys' home here ever since.

== Steyr-Gleink Stiftsmuseum ==
The premises today also accommodate a museum of religious objects, ecclesiastical embroidery and so on.

=== Dwarf Garden ===
Among the curiosities of the abbey was a set of Baroque stone dwarves, or garden gnomes, of the 18th century. They were removed in the 1970s to Schloss Lamberg in Steyr. Similar sets of the same period are to be found in Lambach Abbey, among other places.
