= Austrian Congregation =

Austrian Christian religious organisation

The Austrian Congregation is a congregation of Benedictine monasteries situated in Austria, within the Benedictine Confederation.

== History ==
The Congregation was founded on 3 August 1625 by Pope Urban VIII, and consisted of eleven Benedictine monasteries in Austria:

- Altenburg Abbey
- Garsten Abbey
- Gleink Abbey
- Göttweig Abbey
- Kleinmariazell Abbey
- Kremsmünster Abbey
- Lambach Abbey
- Melk Abbey
- Mondsee Abbey
- Schottenstift, Vienna
- Seitenstetten Abbey

== Salzburg Congregation ==
These were however not all the Benedictine monasteries of present-day Austria. Those in the Diocese of Salzburg were formed in 1641 into the Salzburg Congregation, consisting of:

- Admont Abbey
- Michaelbeuern Abbey
- Ossiach Abbey
- St. Paul's Abbey in the Lavanttal
- St. Peter's Abbey, Salzburg

The diocese also then included two further monasteries, the locations of which are now in Bavaria in Germany:

- St. Vitus' Abbey on the Rott
- Seeon Abbey

Salzburg was secularised and became part of Austria in 1816.

== Later history ==
Several of these abbeys ceased to exist as a result of the dissolution of monasteries enforced by Emperor Joseph II in the 1780s.

Some survived, however, and the 19th century brought a revival in the monastic movement. The two congregations were renewed by Pope Leo XIII on 23 August 1889 as the Congregations of Mary and Joseph respectively, and were combined as the present Austrian Congregation by Pope Pius XI on 8 December 1930.

== Present Congregation ==
The Austrian Congregation (as of 2006) consists of the following monasteries in Austria:

- Admont Abbey
- Altenburg Abbey
- Göttweig Abbey
- Gut Aich Priory
- Kremsmünster Abbey
- Lambach Abbey
- Melk Abbey
- Michaelbeuern Abbey
- Schottenstift, Vienna
- Seitenstetten Abbey
- St. Joseph's Priory, Maria Roggendorf
- Saint Lambert's Abbey
- St. Paul's Abbey in the Lavanttal
- St. Peter's Archabbey, Salzburg
- Kolleg St. Benedikt (student house)
