= Göttweig Abbey =

Benedictine monastery in Lower Austria

Coordinates: 48°22′04″N 15°36′45″E

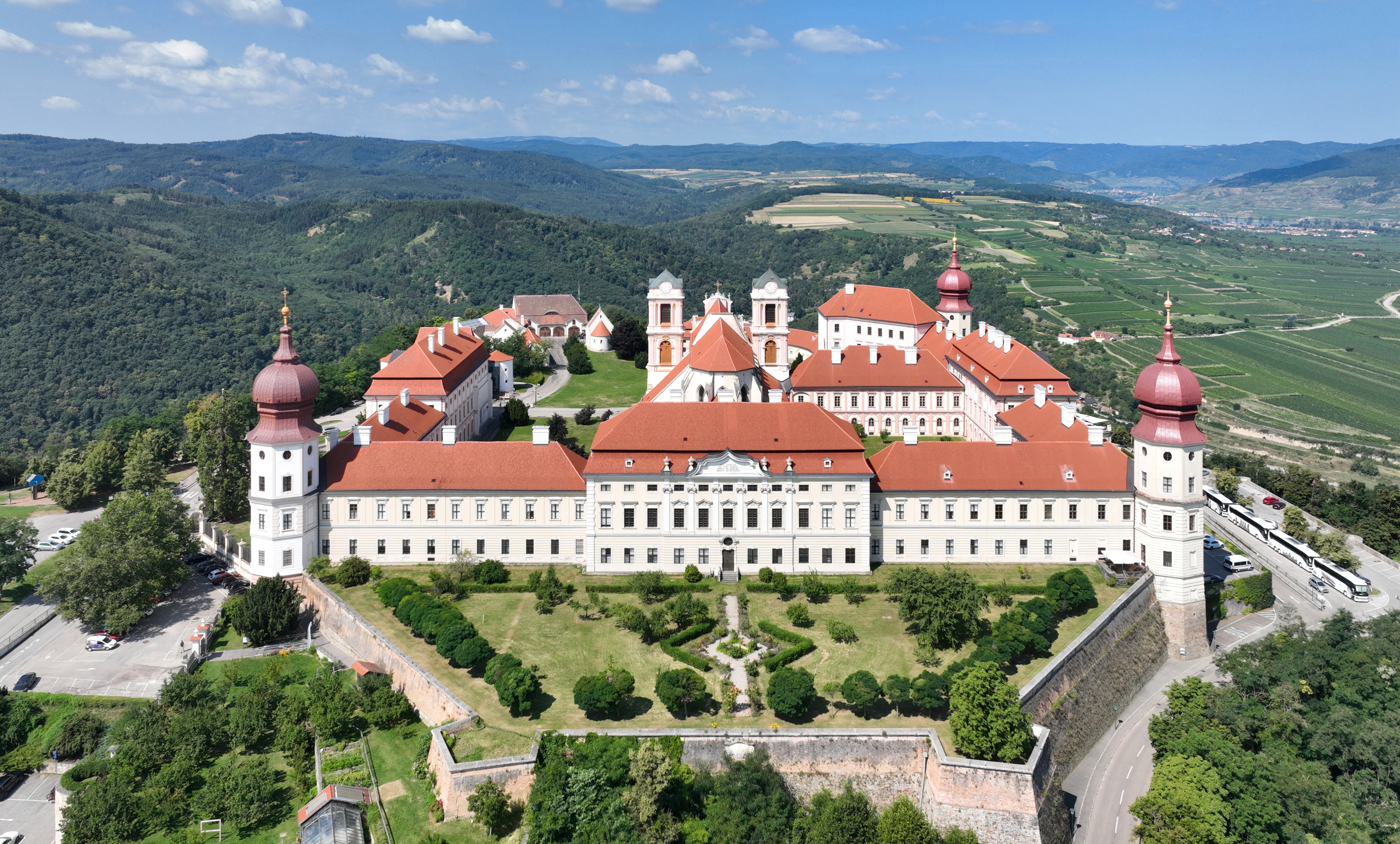
East view of Göttweig Abbey

Göttweig Abbey (German: Stift Göttweig) is a Benedictine monastery near Krems in Lower Austria. It was founded in 1083 by Altmann, Bishop of Passau. In the middle ages the abbey was a seat of learning with a library and a monastic school. The abbey went through a period of decline during the 15th and 16th centuries and in 1580 it was mostly destroyed by a fire. Under a new abbot brought in from Melk Abbey the monastery was rebuilt and restored. After another fire in 1718 the abbey had to be rebuilt again. The new building includes the largest Baroque staircase in Austria with a fresco that is considered a masterpiece of its era. Today the abbey is renowned for its library which holds a valuable collection of books, manuscripts, coins and antiquities.

== History ==
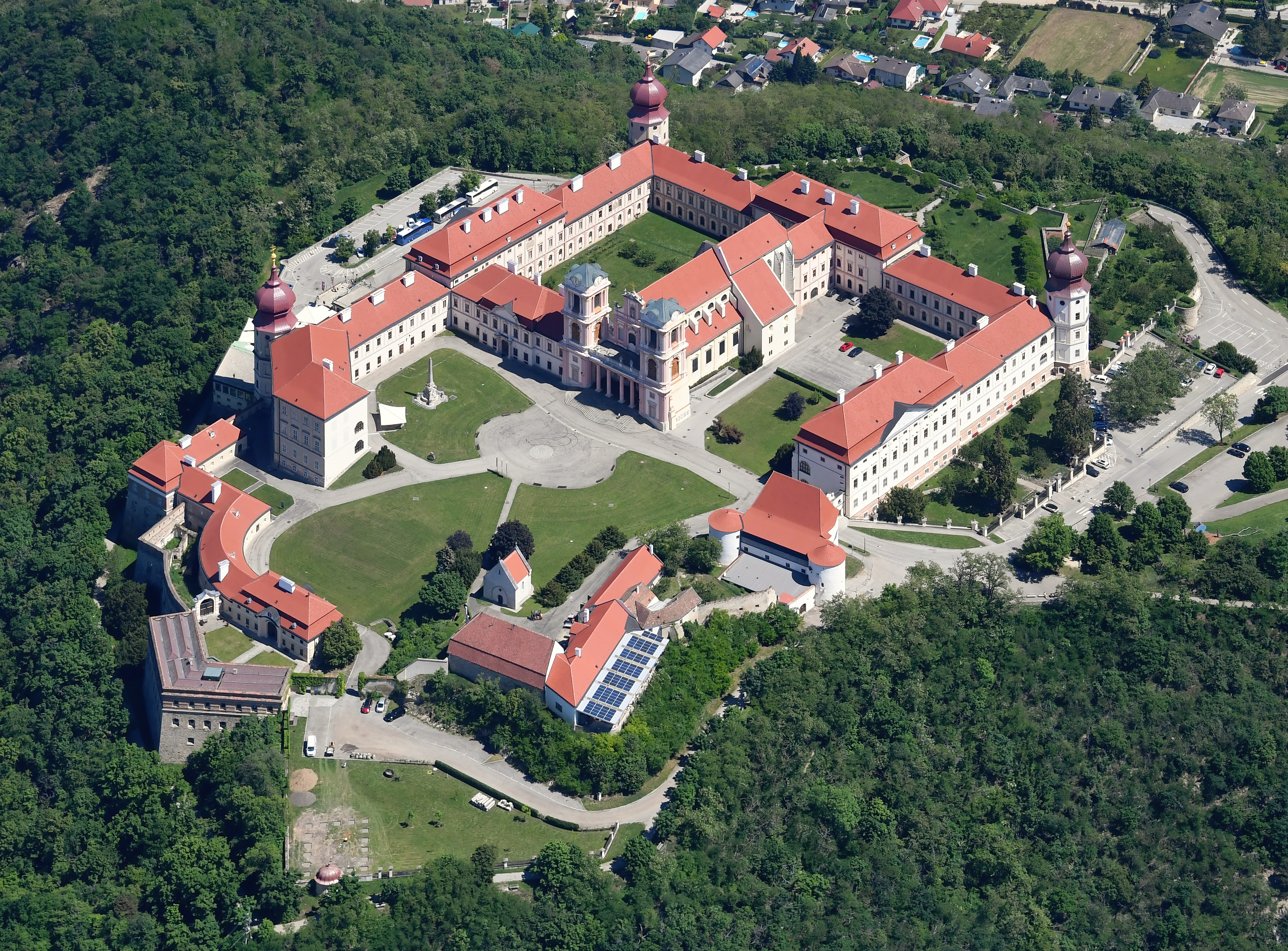
Abbey Church and Cloister

Göttweig Abbey library

Göttweig Abbey was founded as a monastery of canons regular by Blessed Altmann (c. 1015–1091), Bishop of Passau. The high altar of a chapel was dedicated in 1072, but the monastery itself was not until 1083: the foundation charter, dated 9 September 1083, is still preserved in the abbey archives.

By 1094, the discipline of the community had become so lax that Bishop Ulrich of Passau, with the permission of Pope Urban II, introduced the Rule of St. Benedict. Prior Hartmann of St. Blaise's Abbey in the Black Forest was elected abbot. He brought with him from St. Blaise's a number of chosen monks, among whom were Blessed Wirnto and Blessed Berthold, later abbots of Formbach and Garsten respectively.

Under Hartmann (1094–1114) Göttweig became a famous seat of learning and strict monastic observance. He founded a monastic school, organized a library, and at the foot of the hill built a nunnery where it is believed that Ava, the earliest German language woman poet known by name (d. 1127), lived as an anchorite. The nunnery, which was afterwards transferred to the top of the hill, continued to exist until 1557.

During the 15th and 16th centuries, however, the abbey declined to such an extent that between 1556 and 1564 it had no abbot at all, and in 1564 not a single monk remained. At this crisis, an imperial deputation arrived at Göttweig and elected Michael Herrlich, a monk of Melk Abbey, as abbot. The new abbot, who held his office until 1603, restored the monastery spiritually and financially, and rebuilt it after it had been almost entirely destroyed by fire in 1580.

Abbots distinguished during the Reformation were George Falb (1612–1631) and David Corner (1631–1648), who successfully opposed the spread of Protestantism in the district.

In 1718 the monastery burned down and was rebuilt on a grander scale during the abbacy of Gottfried Bessel (1714–1749) to designs by Johann Lucas von Hildebrandt inspired by the Escorial. The imperial staircase is the largest Baroque staircase in Austria. The fresco decorating the staircase is considered a masterpiece of Baroque architecture in Austria. Executed by Paul Troger in 1739, it represents the Holy Roman Emperor Charles VI as Apollo.

== Present day ==
The abbey has a library of 150,000 books and manuscripts, a particularly important collection of religious engravings, and valuable collections of coins, antiquities, musical manuscripts and natural history, all of which survived the dangers of World War II and its immediate aftermath almost without loss.

Since 1625 the abbey has been a member of the Austrian Congregation, now within the Benedictine Confederation; as of 2023, the monks number about 30.

The abbey is part of the Wachau, a UNESCO World Heritage landscape. It is famous for apricot jams and wines crafted on location; the monastery is home to the highest apricot orchard in Austria's Wachau Valley. Göttweig Abbey is along the World Heritage Trail, the Dunkelsteinerwald Trail, or the Way of St. James.

== Burials ==
- Hadmar I of Kuenring
- Altmann of Passau

== Commemorative Euro coin ==
Göttweig Abbey was selected as the main motif of a very high-value collectors' coin: the Austrian Göttweig Abbey commemorative coin, minted on October 11, 2006. The obverse side shows the abbey with its fortress-like towers on top of the hill surrounded by trees and vineyards.

== Gallery ==
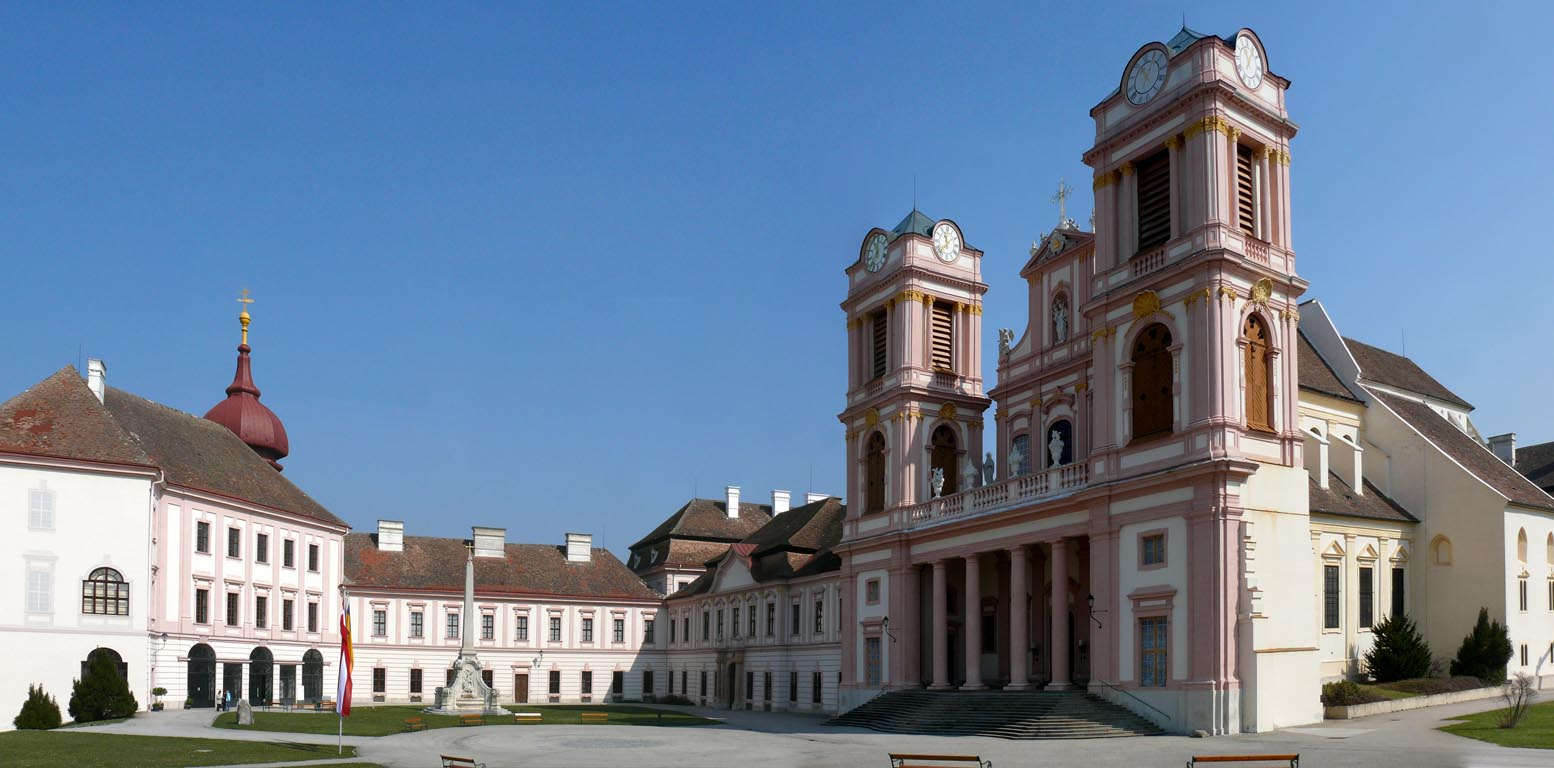
Abbey Church and Cloister

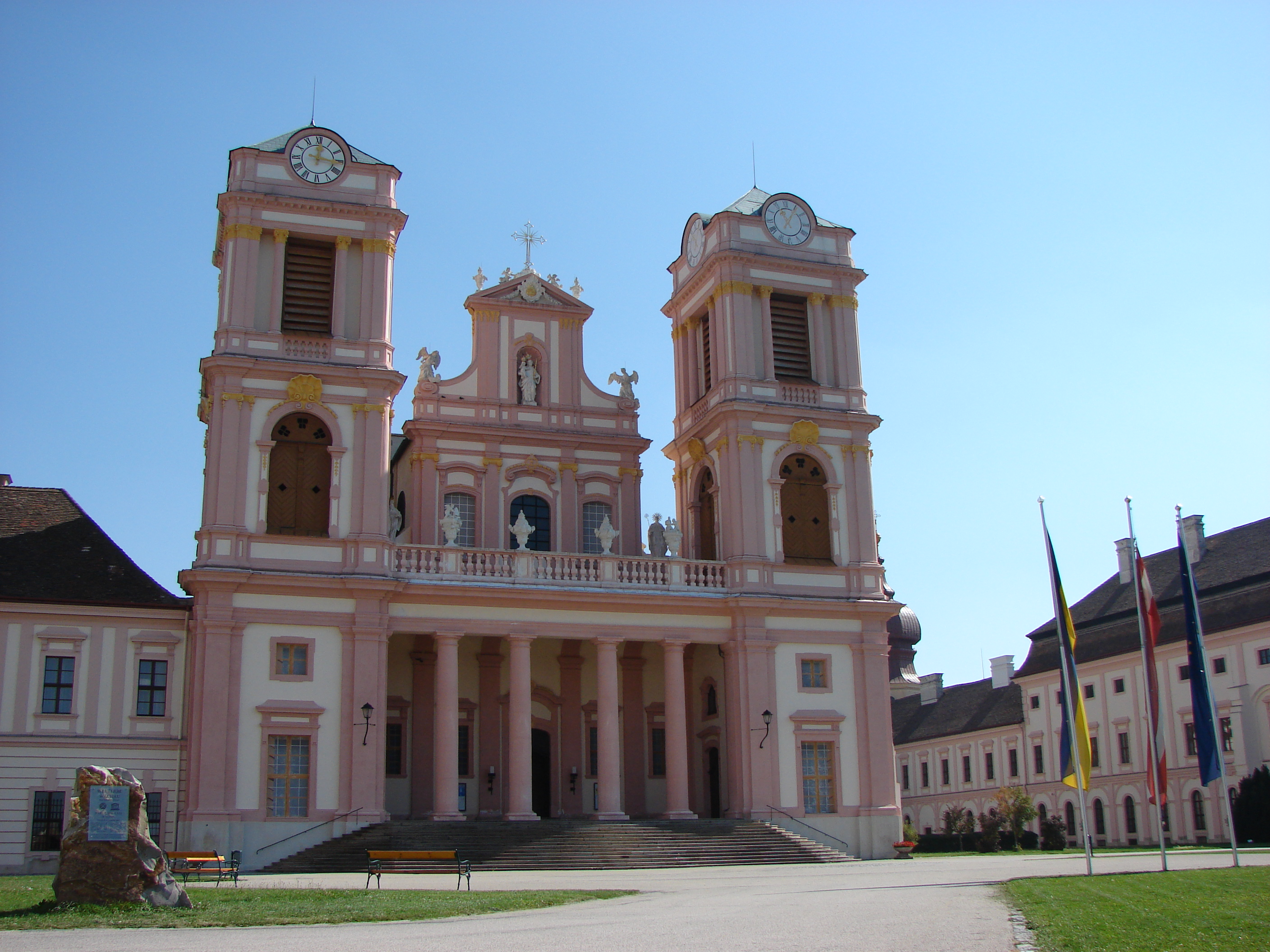
Abbey church

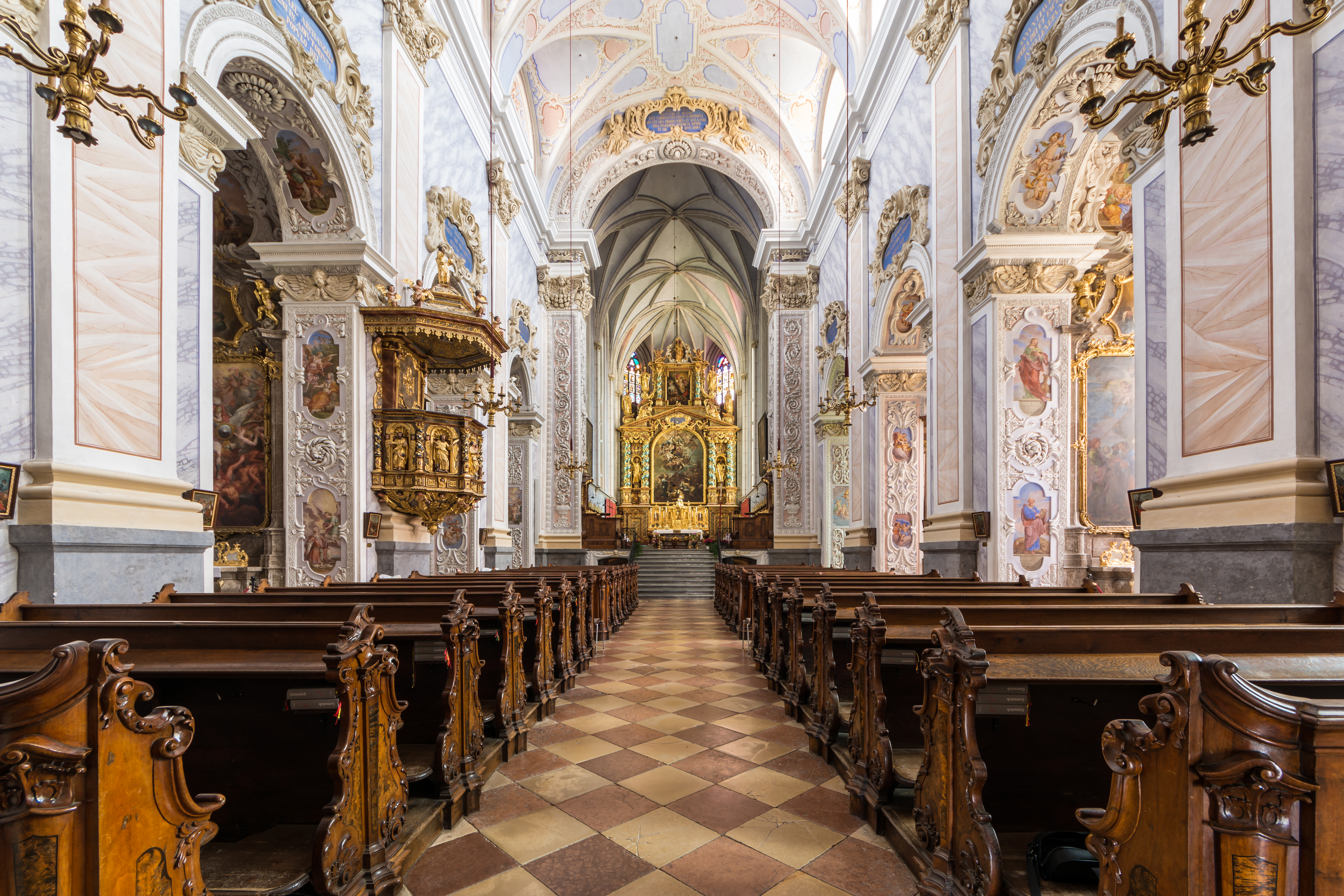
Nave, high altar, and pulpit

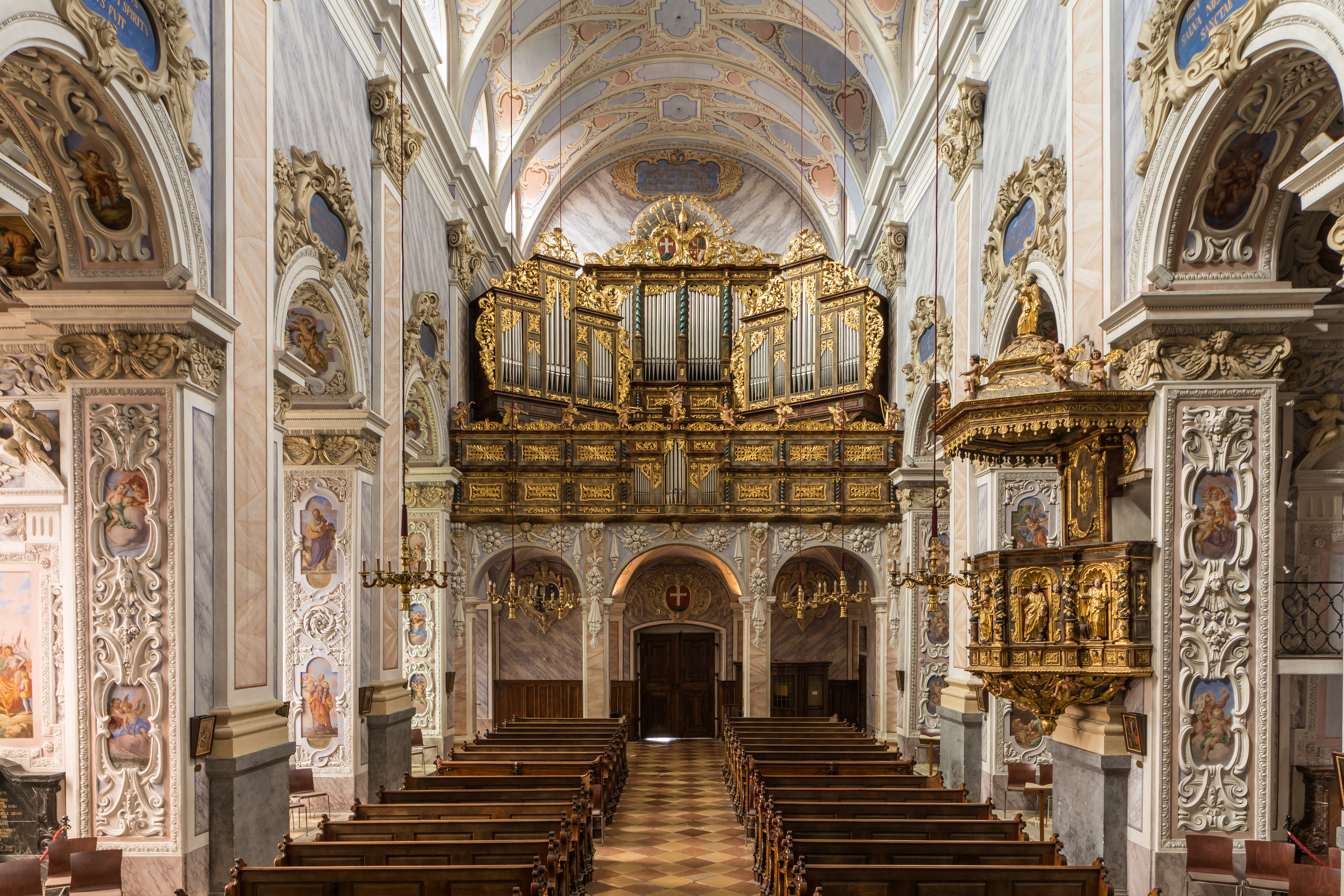
Nave and organ

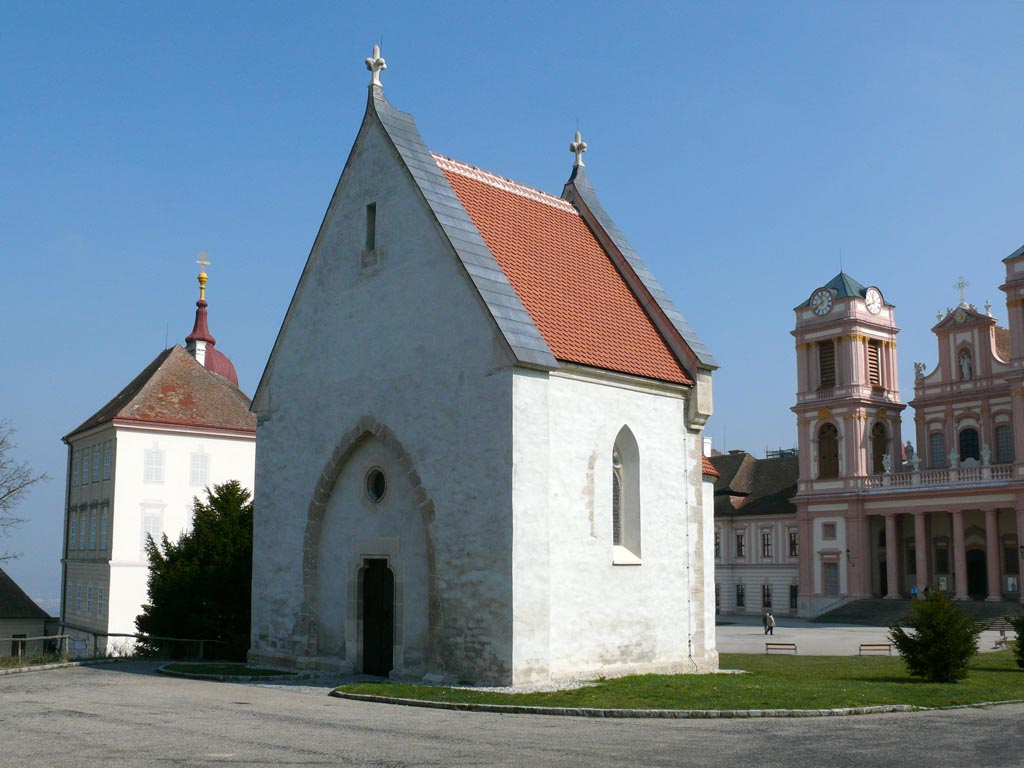
Erentrudis Chapel

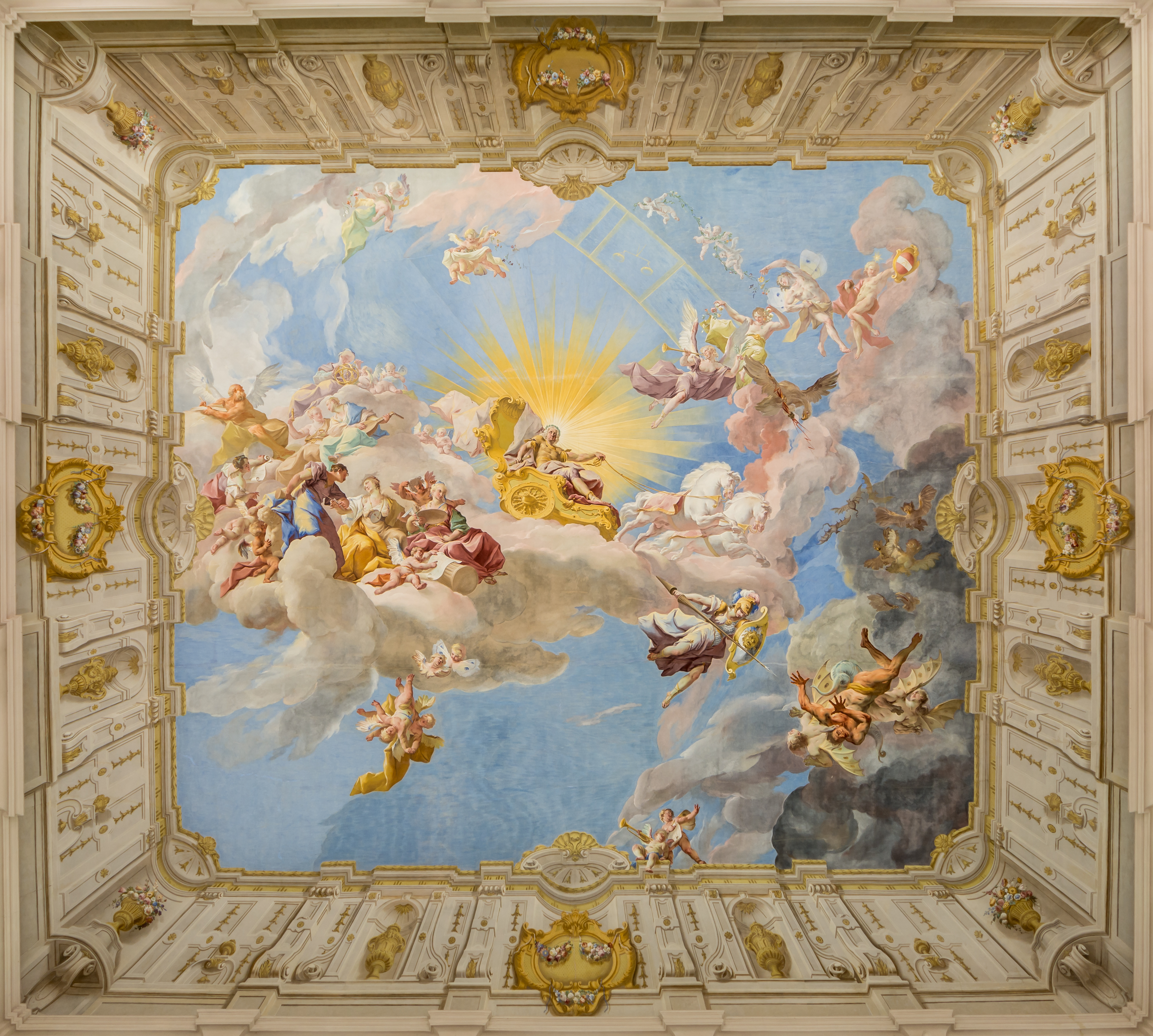
Imperial Staircase: Apotheosis of Charles VI (fresco by Paul Troger, 1739)

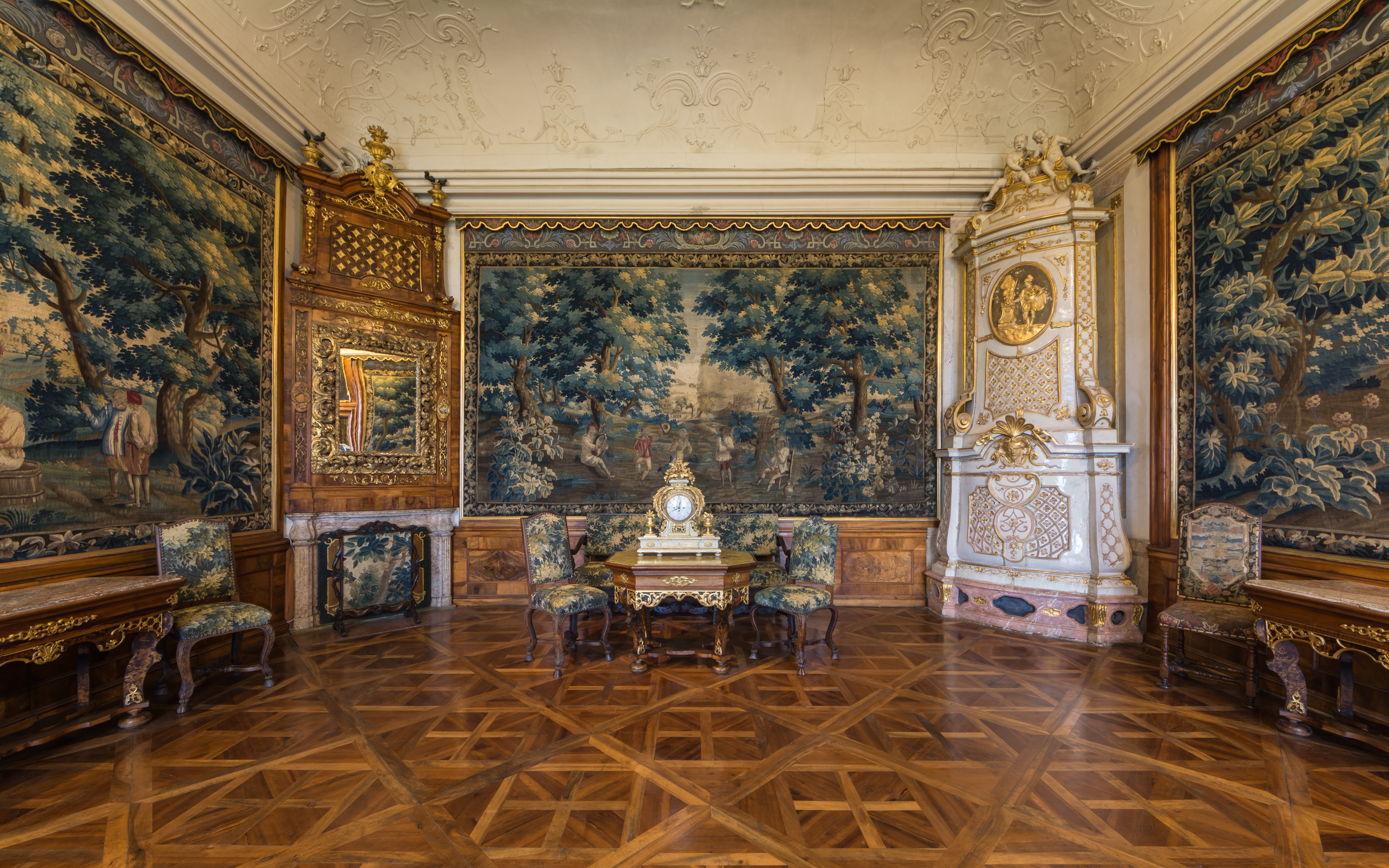
Tapestry room

== Sources ==
- Lechner, Gregor, 1988: Das Benediktinerstift Gottweig in der Wachau und seine Sammlungen. Munich: Schnell & Steiner. ISBN 978-3-7954-0677-6 (in German)
- Geschichte des Stiftes Göttweig 1083–1983. Festschrift zum 900-Jahr-Jubiläum. EOS-Verlag, St. Ottilien 1983 (Studien und Mitteilungen zur Geschichte des Benediktiner-Ordens und seiner Zweige, Bd. 94, H. I–II) (in German)
- 900 Jahre Stift Göttweig 1083-1983. Ein Donaustift als Repräsentant benediktinischer Kultur, Katalog zur Jubiläumsausstellung, Stift Göttweig, Eigenverlag, 1983 (in German)
- Lashofer, Clemens Anton,1983 : Professbuch des Benediktinerstiftes Göttweig. EOS-Verlag, St. Ottilien (Studien und Mitteilungen zur Geschichte des Benediktiner-Ordens und seiner Zweige, Erg.-Bd. 26) (in German)
- Aichinger-Rosenberger, Peter, 2011: „Ecclesia beate mariae in monte kottwich. Zur mittelalterlichen Baugeschichte der Stiftskirche von Göttweig – Ergebnisse einer Bauforschung“. Dissertation for Vienna University (in German)
