= Lisbon =

Capital and largest city of Portugal

Lisbon Lisboa (Portuguese)
- Capital city and municipality
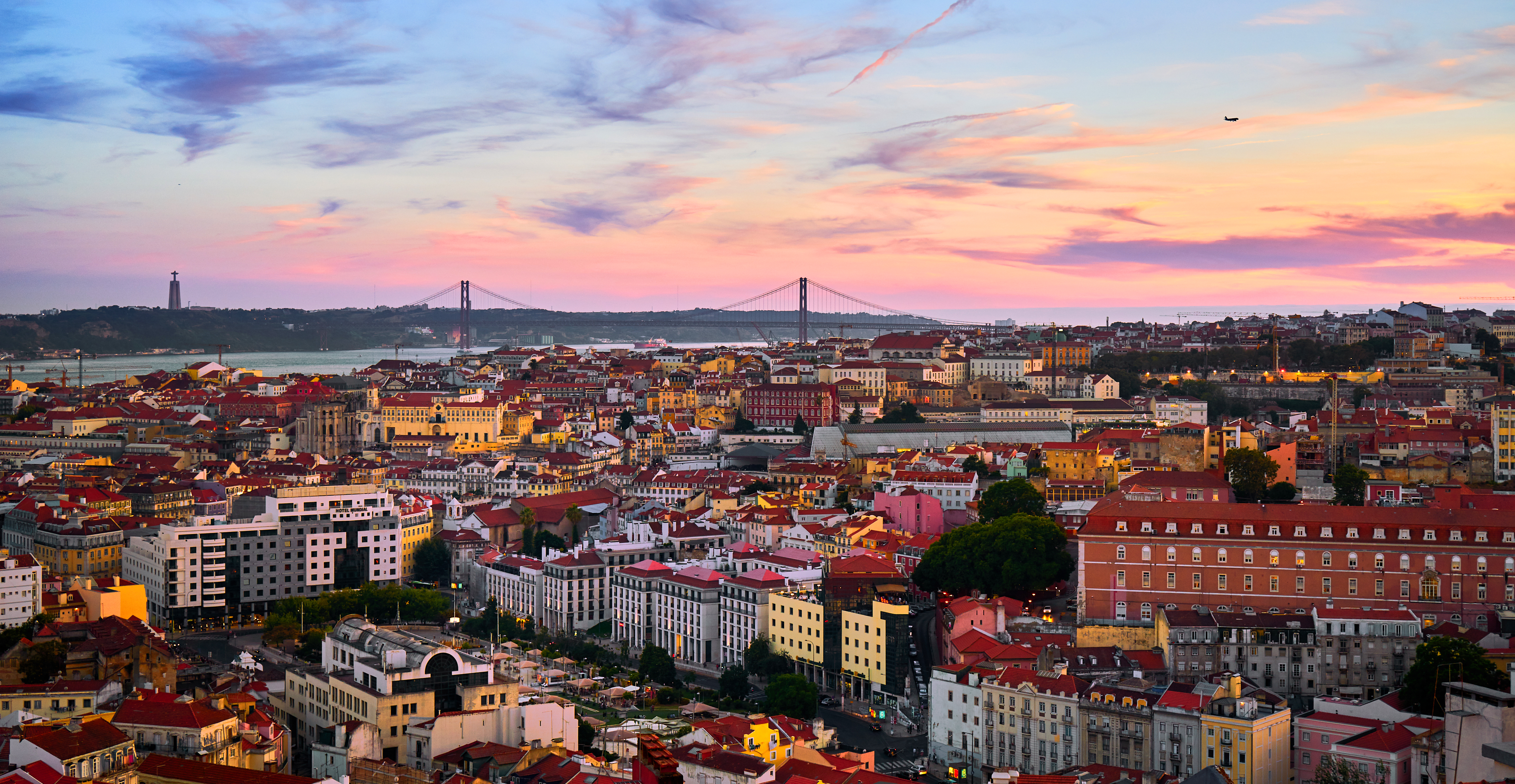
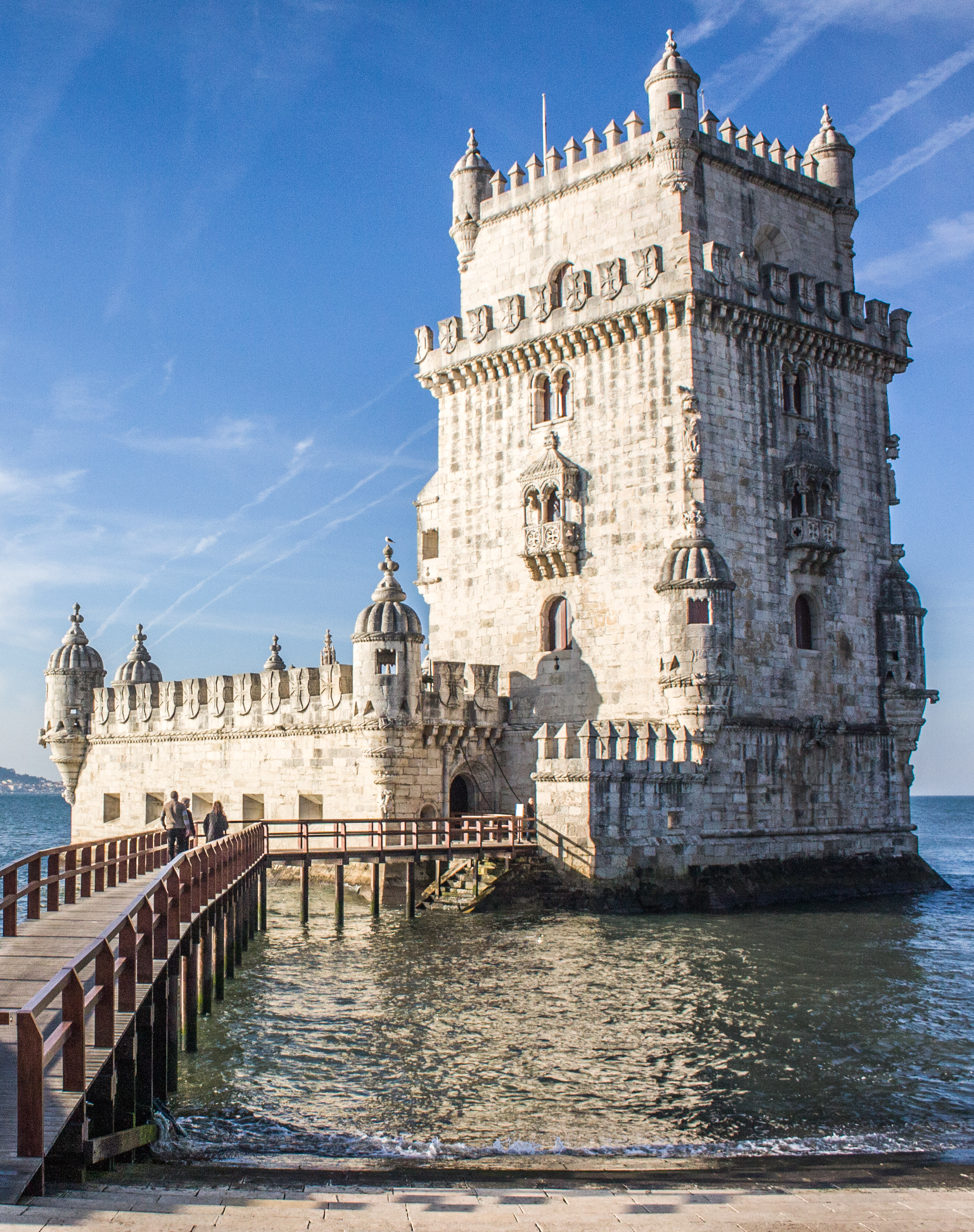
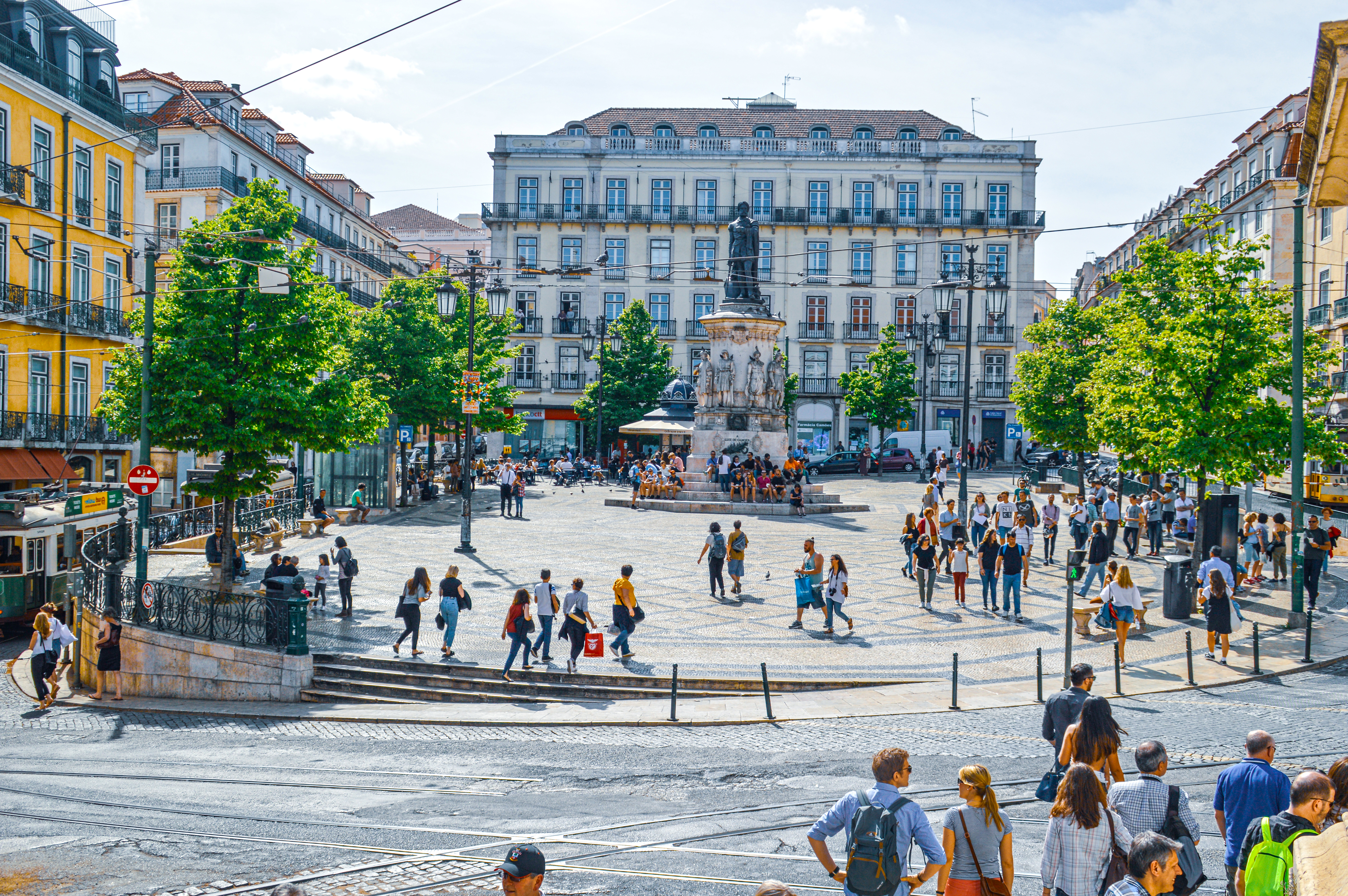
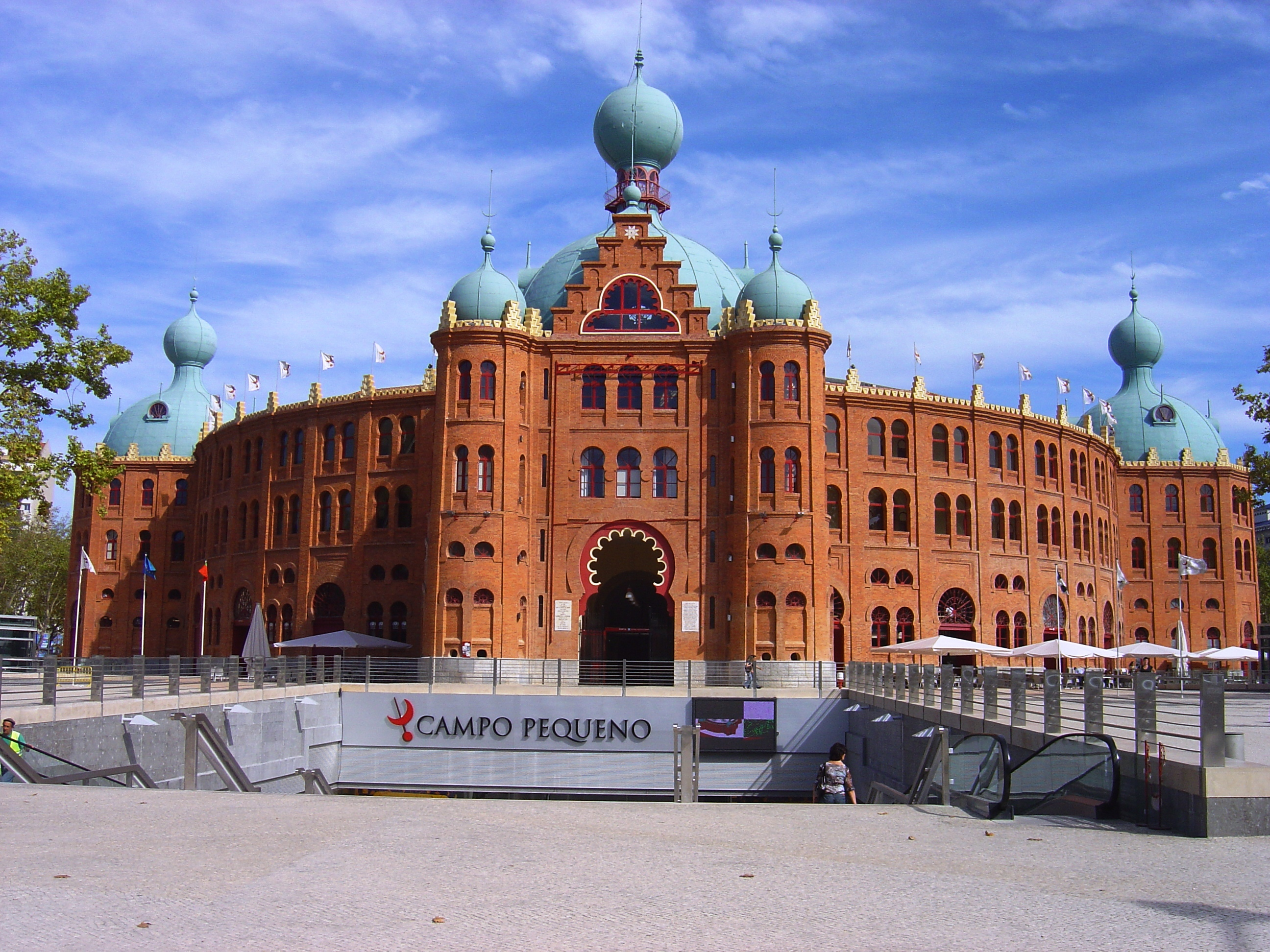
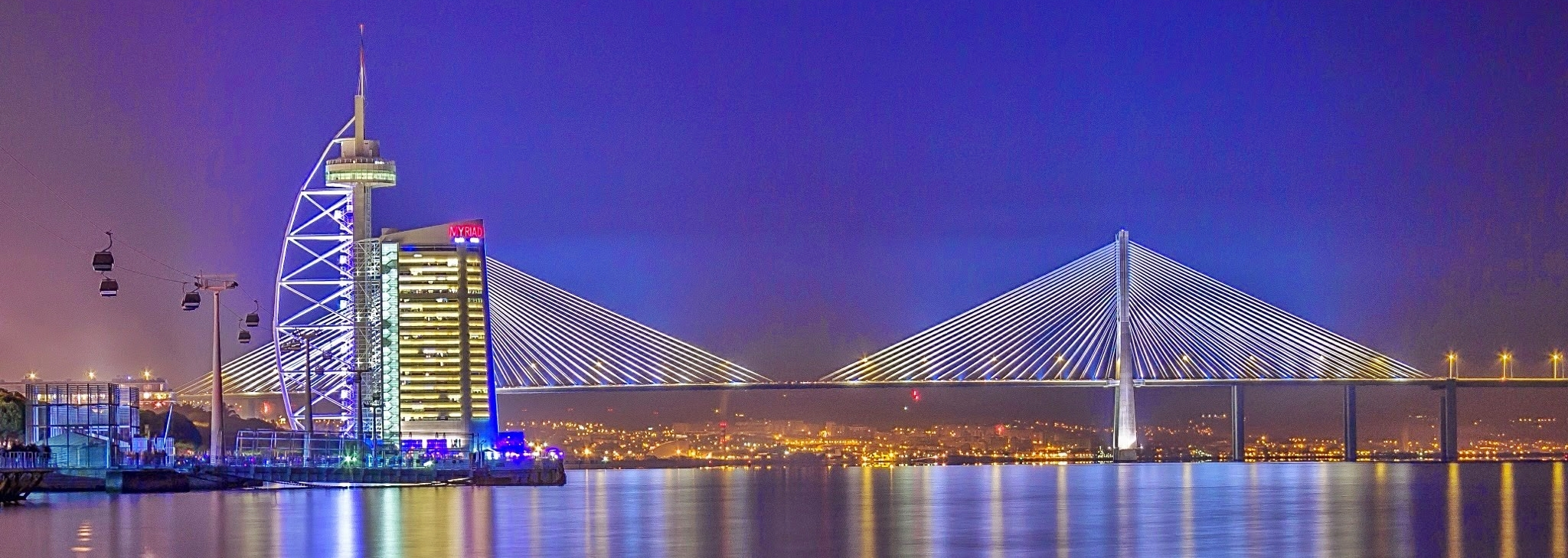
- View with the 25 de Abril Bridge in the background Belém Tower Rua Augusta Arch Lisbon Cathedral Chiado Campo Pequeno Vasco da Gama Tower (left) in the Parque das Nações with Vasco da Gama Bridge (background)

- Flag Coat of arms Logo
- Interactive map of Lisbon
- Location within Portugal Location within Europe
- Coordinates: 38°43′31″N 09°09′00″W
- Country: Portugal
- Metro: Lisbon metropolitan area
- District: Lisbon
- Historic province: Estremadura
- Settlement: c. 1200 BCE
- Roman Olissipo: c. 138 BCE
- Moorish rule: 711 CE
- Siege of Lisbon: 1147 CE
- Capital city: 1256 CE
- Seat: Lisbon Municipal Chamber
- Civil parishes: (see text)

Government
  - Type: Local administrative unit
  - Body: Concelho/Câmara Municipal
  - Mayor: Carlos Moedas
  - Municipal chair: André Moz Caldas

Area
  - Capital city and municipality: 100.05 km^{2} (38.63 sq mi)
  - Metro: 3,015.24 km^{2} (1,164.19 sq mi)
- Elevation: 2 m (6.6 ft)

Population (2025)
  - Capital city and municipality: 658,236
  - Rank: 1st
  - Density: 6,579.1/km^{2} (17,040/sq mi)
  - Metro: 3,352,939
  - Metro density: 1,112.00/km^{2} (2,880.06/sq mi)
- Demonym(s): Lisboan; Lisboeta; Olissiponense; Alfacinha (colloquial)

GDP (nominal) Greater Lisbon
  - Total: €90.686 billion (2024)
  - Per capita: €42,345 (2024)
- Time zone: UTC (WET)
  - Summer (DST): UTC+1 (WEST)
- Postal zone: 1000-000 to 1999-XXX Lisboa
- Area code: (+351) 21 XXX XXXX
- Patron saints: Vincent of Saragossa and Anthony of Lisbon
- Municipal address: Praça do Município, 1; 1149-014 Lisboa
- Municipal holidays: 13 June (St. Anthony's Day)
- Website: cm-lisboa.pt

Lisbon (/ˈlɪzbən/ LIZ-bən; Portuguese: Lisboa [liʒˈβoɐ]) is the capital and most populous city of Portugal, with an estimated population of 658,236 as of 2025, within its administrative limits and 3,353,000 within the metropolis, as of 2025. The city lies in the western part of the Iberian Peninsula, fronting the northern shore of the River Tagus.

Lisbon is one of the oldest cities in the world and the second-oldest European capital city (after Athens), predating other modern European capitals by centuries. Settled by pre-Celtic tribes and later founded and civilised by the Phoenicians, Julius Caesar made it a municipium called Felicitas Julia, adding the term to the name Olisipo. After the fall of the Roman Empire, it was ruled by a series of Germanic tribes from the 5th century, most notably the Visigoths. Later it was captured by the Moors in the 8th century. In 1147, Afonso Henriques conquered the city and in 1255, it became Portugal's capital, replacing Coimbra. It has since been the political, economic, and cultural centre of the country.

As the political centre of the country, Lisbon hosts the government, Assembly of the Republic, Supreme Court of Justice, Armed Forces and residence of the head of state. It is also the centre of Portuguese diplomacy, with ambassadors from 86 countries residing in the city, as well as representations from Taiwan and Palestine. About 3.35 million people live in the Lisbon metropolitan area, which extends beyond the city's administrative area, making it the third largest metropolitan area in the Iberian Peninsula (after Madrid and Barcelona) as well as figuring amongst the 10 most populous urban areas in the European Union. It represents approximately 28% of the country's population.

Lisbon is recognised as an alpha− level global city because of its importance in finance, commerce, fashion, media, entertainment, arts, international trade, education, and tourism. Lisbon is amongst the two Portuguese cities (the other being Porto) to be recognised as a global city, and it is also home to three companies in the Global 2000 (EDP Group, Galp Energia and Jerónimo Martins). Lisbon is one of the major economic centres in Europe, with a growing financial sector, with PSI-20 being part of Euronext, the largest centre for debt and funds listings in the world. The Lisbon region has a higher GDP PPP per capita than any other region in Portugal, US$179 billion or $61,713 per capita. The city is the 40th richest city in the world by gross earnings. Most of the headquarters of multinational corporations in Portugal are located in the Lisbon area.

== Etymology ==
The precise origin of the name is unknown. Lisbon's name may derive from Proto-Celtic or Celtic Olisippo, Lissoppo, or a similar name which other visiting ancient peoples such as the Phoenicians, Greeks, and Romans adapted accordingly, such as the pre-Roman appellation for the Tagus River, Lisso or Lucio. Classical authors writing in Latin and Greek, including Strabo, Solinus, and Martianus Capella, referred to popular legends that the city of Lisbon was founded by the mythical hero Ulysses (Odysseus). Lisbon's name was written Ulyssippo in Latin by the geographer Pomponius Mela, a native of Hispania. It was later referred to as "Olisippo" by Pliny the Elder and by the Greeks as Olissipo (Ὀλισσιπών) or Olissipona (Ὀλισσιπόνα).

Another claim repeated in historical literature is that the name of Lisbon could originate from a supposed ancient Phoenician term Alis-Ubbo, meaning "safe harbour" or "pleasant haven". Although modern archaeological excavations show there may have been Phoenician presence at this location since 1000 BC, this folk etymology completely lacks any evidence and "is never attested in ancient classical literature".

Lisbon's name is commonly abbreviated as "LX" or "Lx", originating in an antiquated spelling of Lisbon as Lixbõa. While the old spelling has since been completely dropped from usage and goes against modern language standards, the abbreviation is still commonly used.

== History ==
=== Origins ===
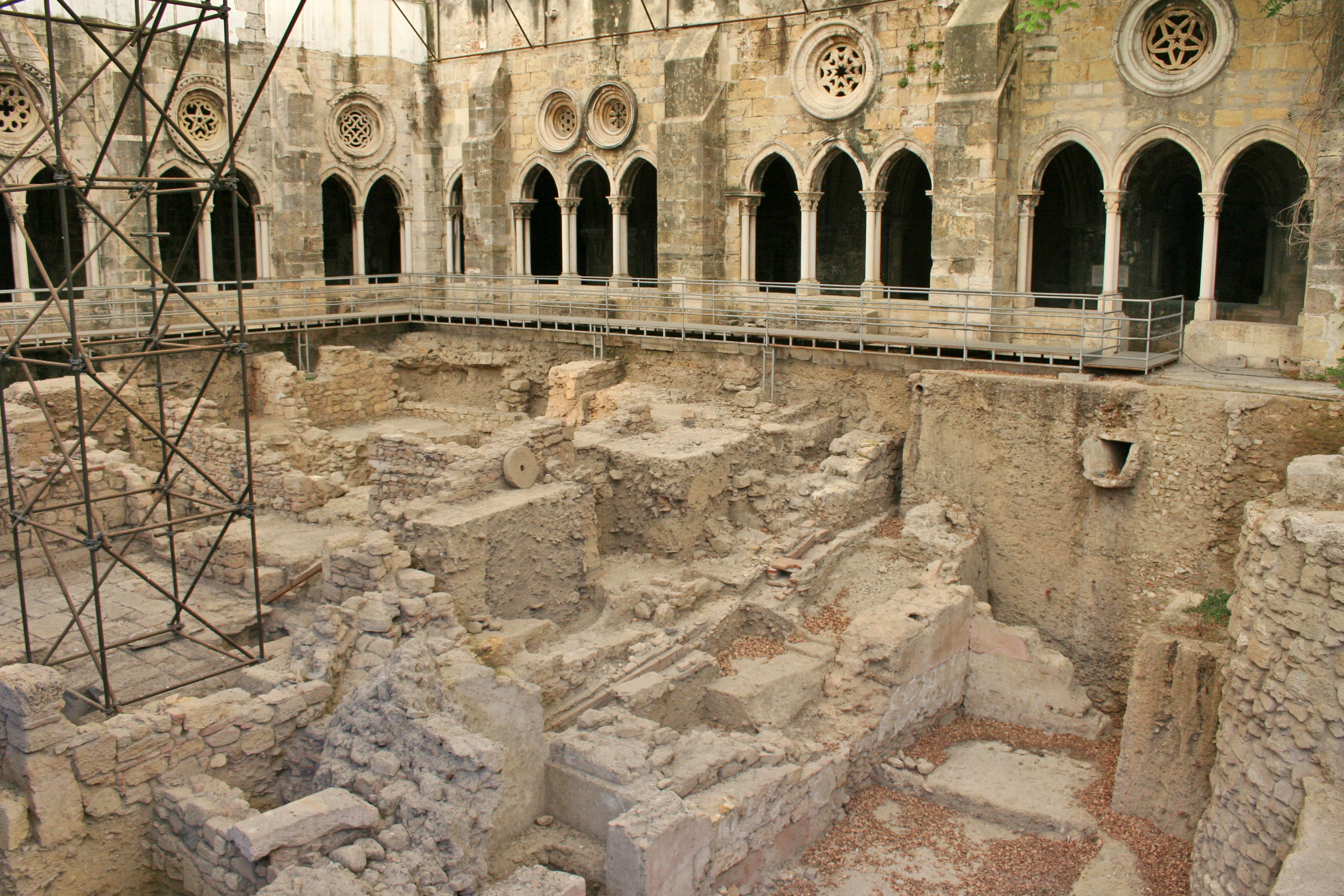
Phoenician archaeological dig in a cloister of the Lisbon Cathedral

During the Neolithic period, the region was inhabited by Pre-Celtic tribes, who built religious and funerary monuments, megaliths, dolmens and menhirs, which still survive in areas on the periphery of Lisbon. The Indo-European Celts invaded in the 1st millennium BC, mixing with the Pre-Indo-European population, thus giving rise to Celtic-speaking local tribes such as the Cempsi or Sefes.

Although the first fortifications on Lisbon's Castelo hill are known to be no older than the 2nd century BC, recent archaeological finds have shown that Iron Age people occupied the site from the 8th to 6th centuries BC. This indigenous settlement maintained commercial relations with the Phoenicians, which would account for the recent findings of Phoenician pottery and other material objects. Archaeological excavations made near the Castle of São Jorge (Castelo de São Jorge) and Lisbon Cathedral indicate there may have been a Phoenician presence at this location since 1000 BC, and it can be stated with confidence that a Phoenician trading post stood on a site now the centre of the present city, on the southern slope of the Castle hill. The sheltered harbour in the Tagus River estuary was an ideal spot for an Iberian settlement and would have provided a secure harbour for unloading and provisioning trading ships. The Tagus settlement was an important centre of commercial trade with the inland tribes, providing an outlet for the valuable metals, salt and salted-fish they collected, and for the sale of the Lusitanian horses renowned in antiquity.

According to a persistent legend, the location was named for the Greek mythical king of Ithaca, Ulysses, who founded the city when he sailed westward to the ends of the known world.

=== Roman era ===
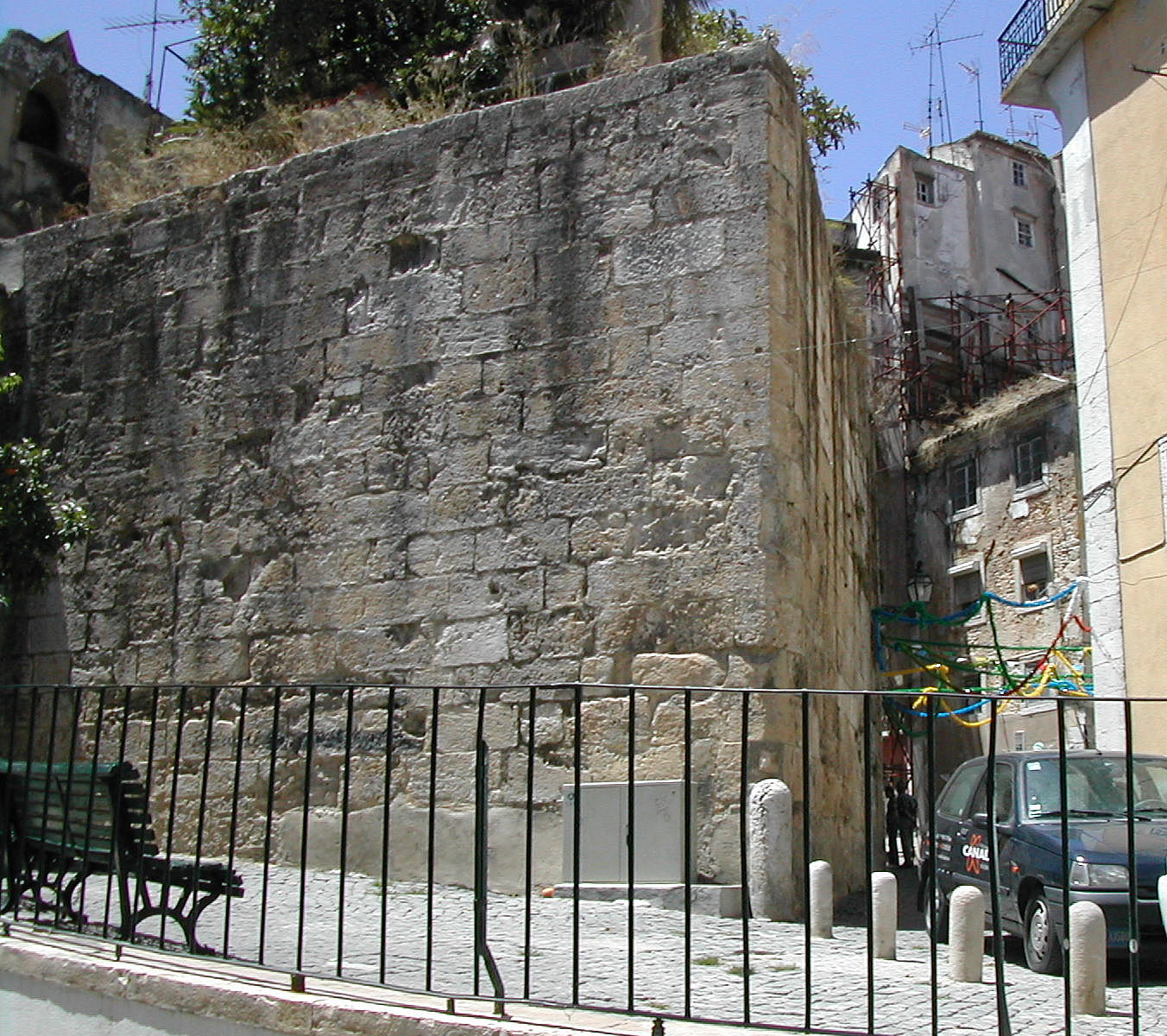
Part of the Cerca Velha (Old Wall), originally built by the Romans

Following the defeat of Hannibal in 202 BC during the Punic wars, the Romans determined to deprive Carthage of its most valuable possession: Hispania (the Iberian Peninsula). The defeat of Carthaginian forces by Scipio Africanus in Eastern Hispania allowed the pacification of the west, led by Consul Decimus Junius Brutus Callaicus. Decimus obtained the alliance of Olisipo (which sent men to fight alongside the Roman Legions against the northwestern Celtic tribes) by integrating it into the empire, as the Municipium Cives Romanorum Felicitas Julia. Local authorities were granted self-rule over a territory that extended 50 km (31 mi); exempt from taxes, its citizens were given the privileges of Roman citizenship, and it was then integrated with the Roman province of Lusitania (whose capital was Emerita Augusta).

Lusitanian raids and rebellions during Roman occupation required the construction of a wall around the settlement. During Augustus' reign, the Romans also built a great theatre; the Cassian Baths (underneath Rua da Prata); temples to Jupiter, Diana, Cybele, Tethys and Idea Phrygiae (an uncommon cult from Asia Minor), in addition to temples to the Emperor; a large necropolis under Praça da Figueira; a large forum and other buildings such as insulae (multi-storied apartment buildings) in the area between Castle Hill and the historic city core. Many of these ruins were first unearthed during the mid-18th century (when the recent discovery of Pompeii made Roman archaeology fashionable among Europe's upper classes).

The city prospered as piracy was eliminated and technological advances were introduced, consequently Felicitas Julia became a centre of trade with the Roman provinces of Britannia (particularly Cornwall) and the Rhine. Economically strong, Olisipo was known for its garum (a fish sauce highly prized by the elites of the empire and exported in amphorae to Rome), wine, salt, and horse-breeding, while Roman culture permeated the hinterland. The city was connected by a broad road to Western Hispania's two other large cities, Bracara Augusta in the province of Tarraconensis (Portuguese Braga), and Emerita Augusta, the capital of Lusitania. The city was ruled by an oligarchical council dominated by two families, the Julii and the Cassiae, although regional authority was administered by the Roman Governor of Emerita or directly by Emperor Tiberius. Among the majority of Latin speakers lived a large minority of Greek traders and slaves.

Olisipo, like most great cities in the Western Empire, was a centre for the dissemination of Christianity. Its first attested Bishop was Potamius (c. 356), and there were several martyrs during the period of persecution of the Christians: Verissimus, Maxima, and Julia are the most significant examples. By the time of the Fall of Rome, Olisipo had become a notable Christian centre.

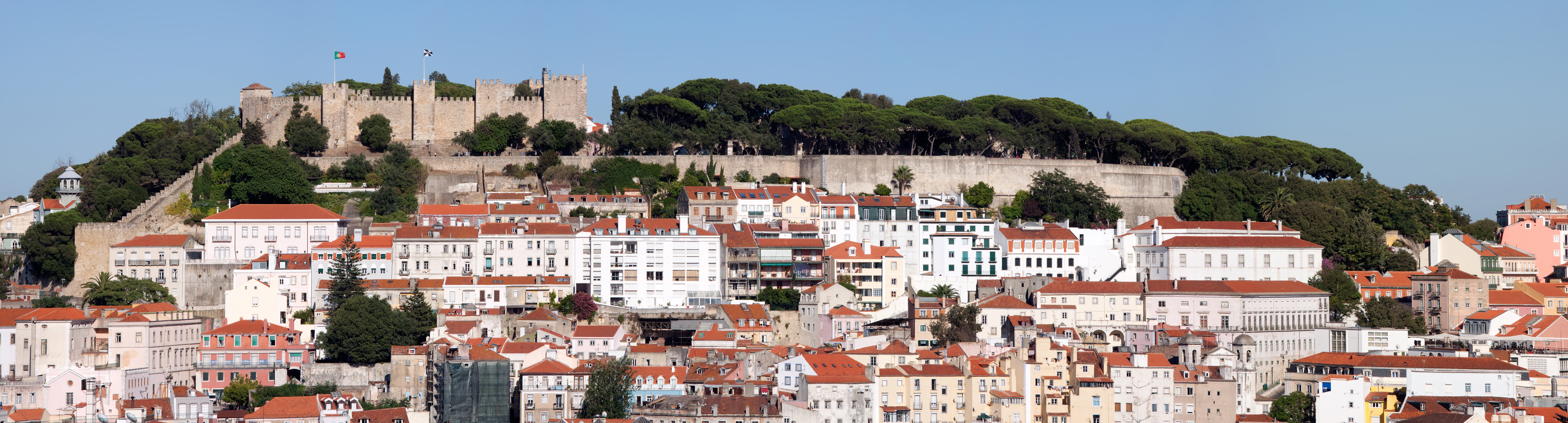
São Jorge Castle and the surrounding neighbourhoods of Castelo, Mouraria, and Alfama

=== Middle Ages ===
Following the disintegration of the Western Roman Empire, there were barbarian invasions; between 409 and 429 the city was occupied successively by Sarmatians, Alans and Vandals. The Germanic Suebi, who established a kingdom in Gallaecia (modern Galicia and northern Portugal), with its capital in Bracara Augusta, also controlled the region of Lisbon until 585. In 585, the Suebi Kingdom was integrated into the Germanic Visigothic Kingdom of Toledo, which comprised all of the Iberian Peninsula: Lisbon was then called Ulishbona.

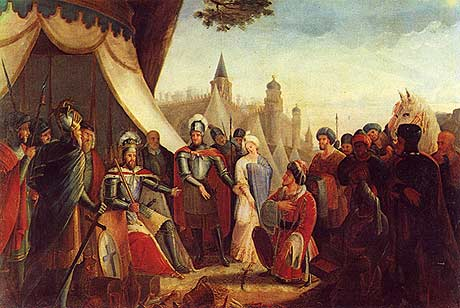
King Afonso Henriques reconquered the city from the Almoravid Empire at the 1147 siege of Lisbon.

On 6 August 711, Lisbon was taken by the Muslim forces of the Umayyad Caliphate. These conquerors built many mosques and houses, rebuilt the city wall (known as the Cerca Moura) and established administrative control, while permitting the diverse population of Muwallads, Arabs, Berbers, Mozarabs, Saqaliba, and Jews to maintain their socio-cultural lifestyles. Mozarabic was the native language spoken by most of the Christian population although Arabic was widely known as spoken by all religious communities. Islam was the official religion practised by the Arabs, Berbers, Saqaliba and Muwallad.

The ancient Muslim influence is still visible in the Alfama district, an old quarter of Lisbon that survived the 1755 Lisbon earthquake: many place-names are derived from Arabic and the Alfama (the oldest existing district of Lisbon) was derived from the Arabic "al-hamma".

For a brief time, Lisbon was an independent Muslim kingdom known as the Taifa of Lisbon (1022–1034), before being conquered by the larger Taifa of Badajoz.

In 1108 Lisbon was raided and occupied by Norwegian crusaders led by Sigurd I on their way to the Holy Land as part of the Norwegian Crusade and occupied by crusader forces for three years. It was taken by the Moorish Almoravids in 1111.

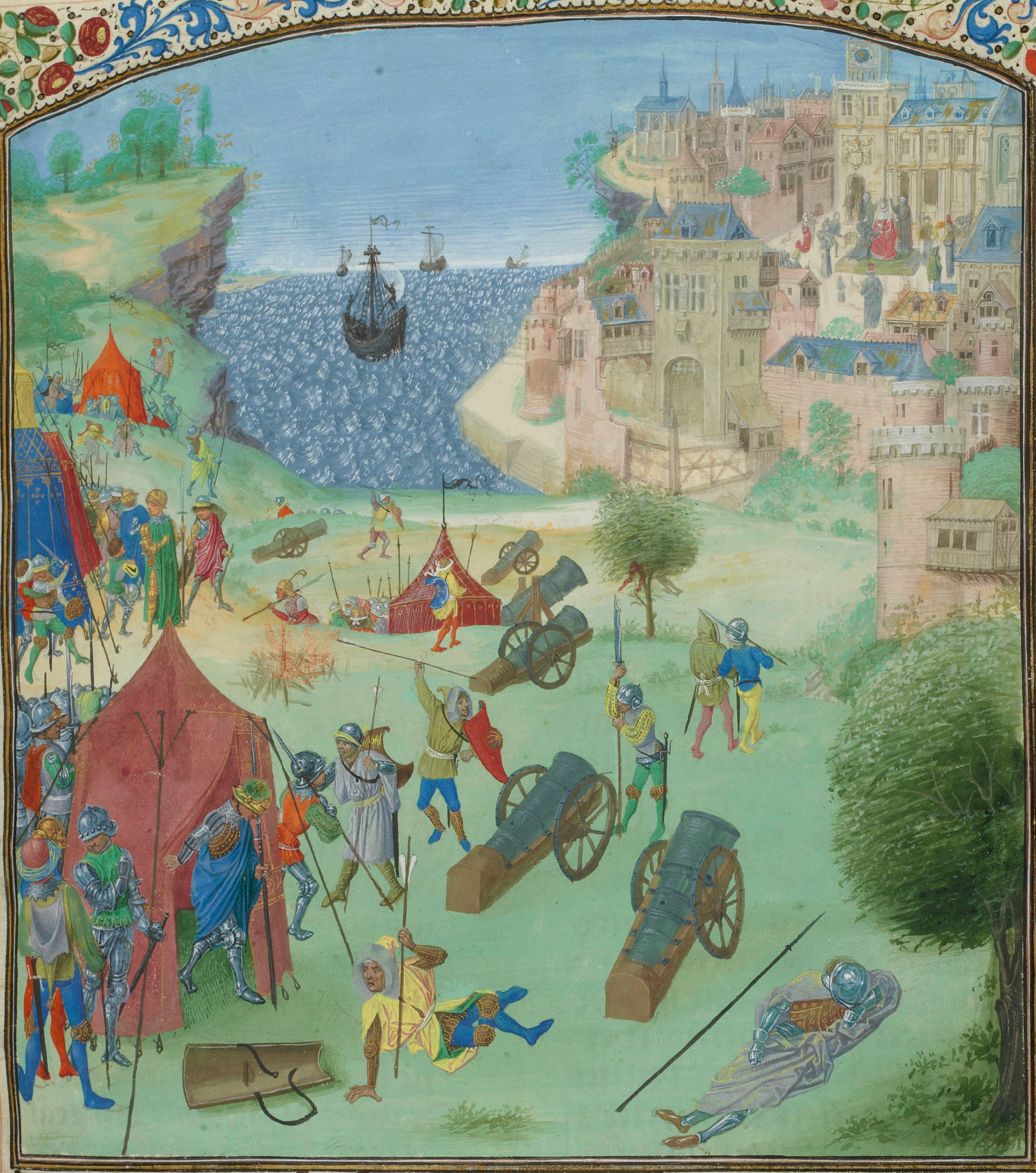
The 1384 siege of Lisbon in Froissart's Chronicles

In 1147, as part of Portuguese theatre of the Reconquista, Afonso I of Portugal laid siege and conquered Lisbon with the aid of crusader knights. The city, with about 154,000 residents at the time, was returned to Christian rule. The conquest of Portugal and re-establishment of Christianity is one of the most significant events in Lisbon's history, described in the chronicle Expugnatione Lyxbonensi, which describes, among other incidents, how the local bishop was killed by the crusaders and the city's residents prayed to the Virgin Mary as it happened. Some of the Muslim residents converted to Roman Catholicism and most of those who did not convert fled to other parts of the Islamic world, primarily Muslim Spain and North Africa. All mosques were either destroyed or altered and converted into churches. As a result of the end of Muslim rule in the mid-12th century, spoken Arabic quickly lost its place in Lisbon, and disappeared altogether.

With its central location, Lisbon became the capital city of the new Portuguese territory in 1255. The first Portuguese university was founded in Lisbon in 1290 by King Denis I; for many years the Studium Generale (General Study) was transferred intermittently to Coimbra, where it was installed permanently in the 16th century as the University of Coimbra.

In 1384, the city was besieged by King Juan I of Castille, as a part of the ongoing 1383–1385 Crisis. The result of the siege was a victory for the Portuguese led by Nuno Álvares Pereira.

During the last centuries of the Middle Ages, Lisbon expanded substantially and became an important trading post with both Northern European and Mediterranean cities.

=== Early Modern ===
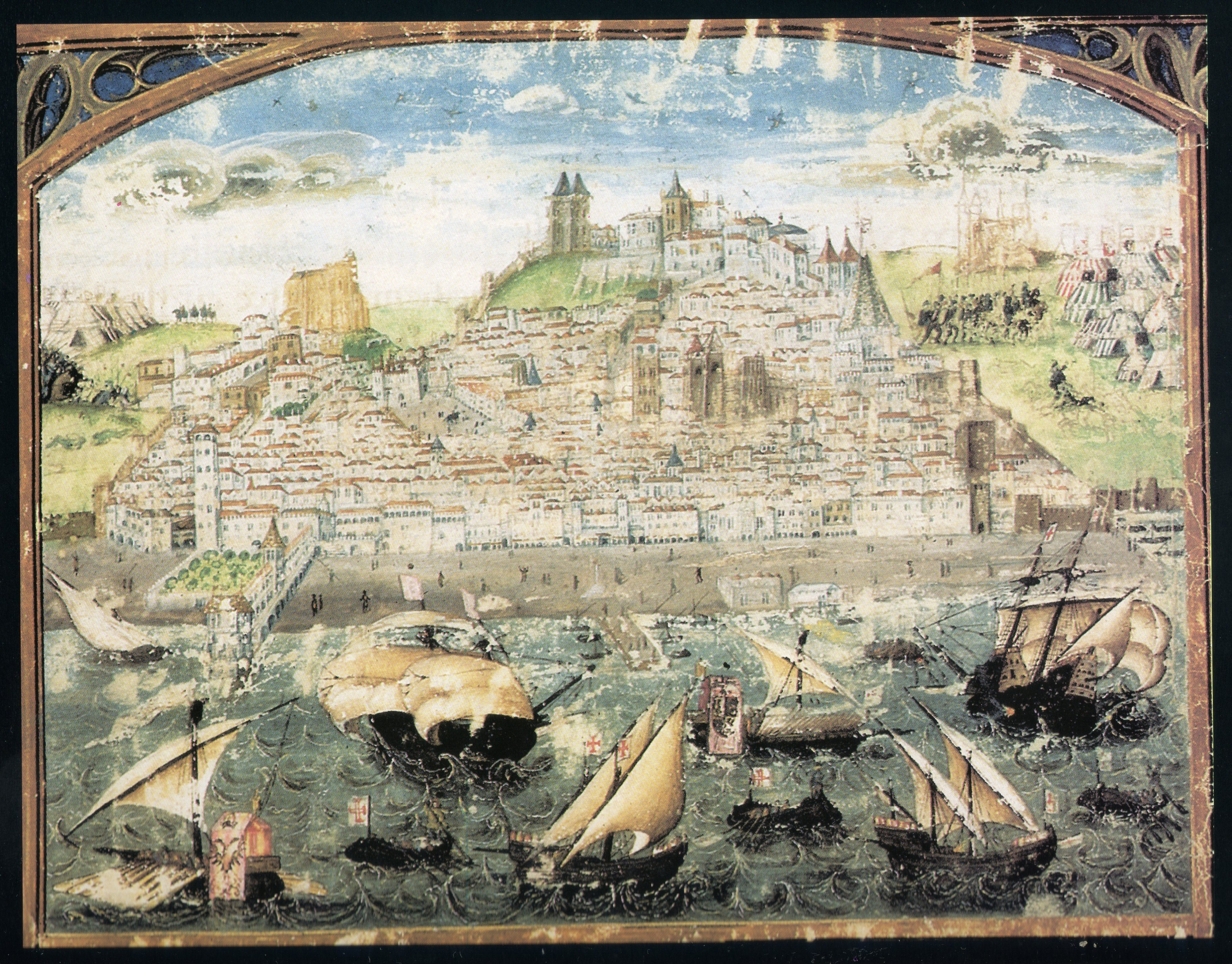
The oldest known panorama of Lisbon (1500–1510) from the Crónica de Dom Afonso Henriques by Duarte Galvão

When the Spaniards expelled the Jews from Spanish territory, many of them fled to Lisbon. Although acknowledging the central importance of the Jews to the city's prosperity, Manuel I decreed in 1497 that all Jews must convert to Christianity, only those who refused being forced to leave, but not before the expropriation of their property. In 1506, a four-day anti-Semitic riot by Old Christians in Lisbon led to the deaths of about 1,000 to 4,000 "New Christians", the descendants of Sephardic Jews whom were primarily forced to convert. The king was at Évora when these events occurred, but angered when he received the news, he ordered an investigation which resulted in two of the instigating friars being excommunicated and burned alive.

Most of the Portuguese expeditions of the Age of Discovery set out from Lisbon during the period from the end of the 15th century to the beginning of the 17th century, including Vasco da Gama's expedition to India in 1498. The following years of the 16th century began Lisbon's golden era: the city was the European hub of commerce between Africa, India, the Far East and later, Brazil, and acquired great riches by exploiting the trade in spices, slaves, sugar, textiles and other goods. This period saw the rise of the exuberant Manueline style in architecture, which left its mark in many 16th-century monuments (including Lisbon's Belém Tower and Jerónimos Monastery, which were declared UNESCO World Heritage Sites). A description of Lisbon in the 16th century was written by Damião de Góis and published in 1554.

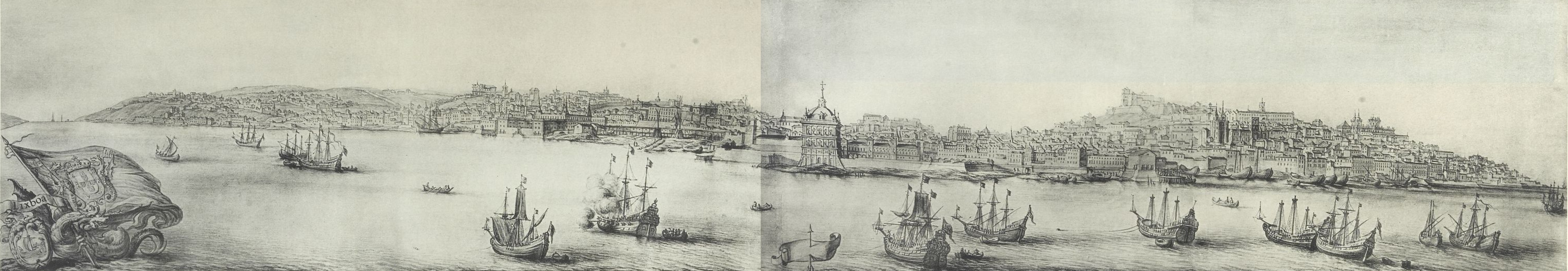
Panoramic drawing of Lisbon done by Pier Maria Baldi in 1669, who accompanied Cosme III de Médici in his european travels. Both the Corte Real Palace (on the left by the riverside), the Ribeira Palace (in the middle), the Sé of Lisbon and Saint George's Castle can be seen.

The succession crisis of 1580 initiated a sixty-year period of dual monarchy in Portugal and Spain under the Spanish Habsburgs. This is referred to as the "Philippine Dominion" (Domínio Filipino), since all three Spanish kings during that period were called Philip (Filipe). In 1589, Lisbon was the target of an incursion by the English Armada led by Francis Drake, while Queen Elizabeth supported a Portuguese pretender in Antonio, Prior of Crato, but support for Crato was lacking and the expedition was a failure. The Portuguese Restoration War, which began with a coup d'état organised by the nobility and bourgeoisie in Lisbon and executed on 1 December 1640, restored Portuguese independence. The period from 1640 to 1668 was marked by periodic skirmishes between Portugal and Spain, as well as short episodes of more serious warfare until the Treaty of Lisbon was signed in 1668.

In the early 18th century, gold from Brazil allowed King John V to sponsor the building of several Baroque churches and theatres in the city. Prior to the 18th century, Lisbon had experienced several significant earthquakes – eight in the 14th century, five in the 16th century (including the 1531 earthquake that destroyed 1,500 houses and the 1597 earthquake in which three streets vanished), and three in the 17th century.

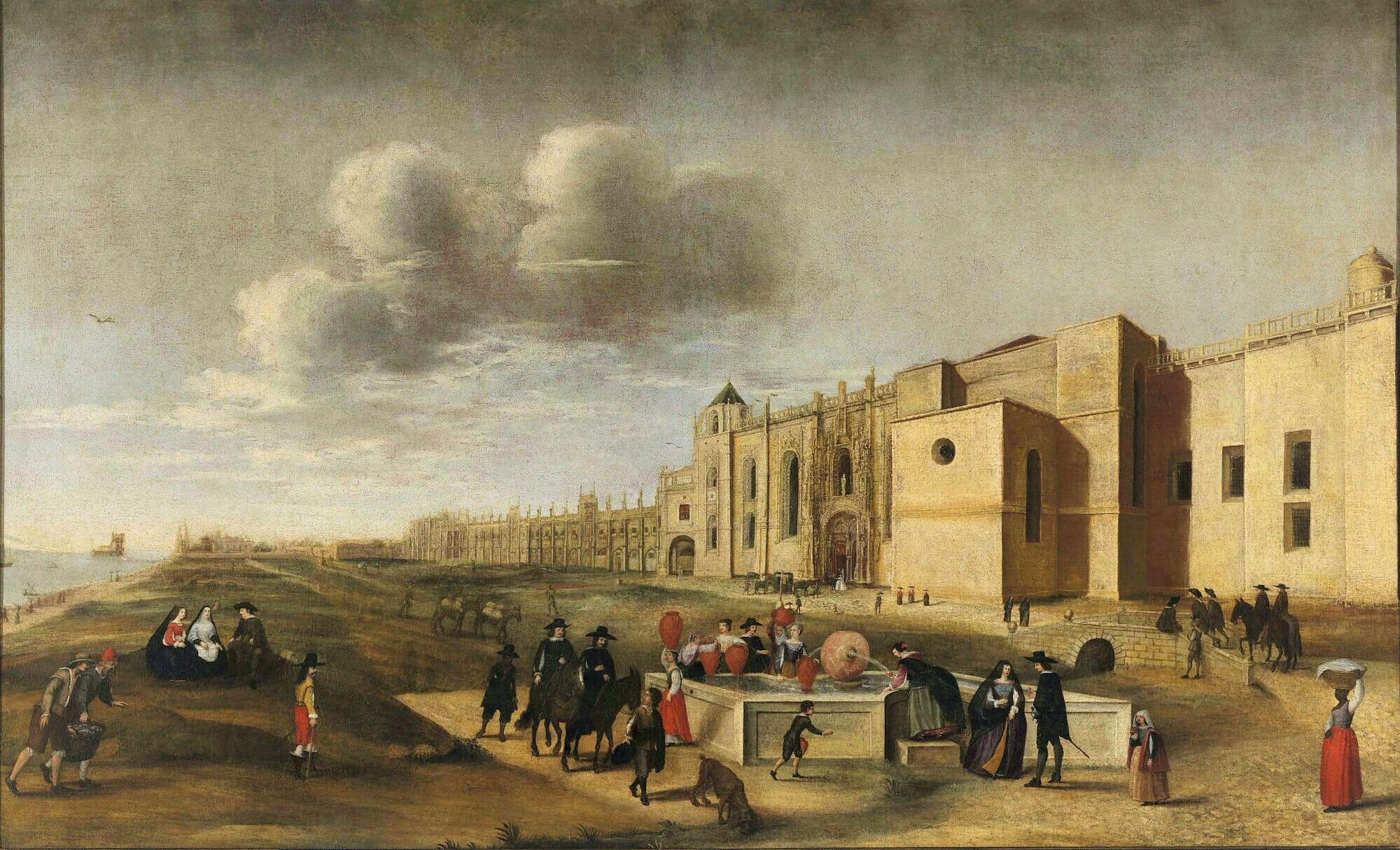
King Manuel I ordered Jerónimos Monastery to be built in Belém, to serve Portuguese discoverers.

On 1 November 1755, the city was destroyed by another devastating earthquake, which killed an estimated 30,000 to 40,000 Lisbon residents of a population estimated at between 200,000 and 275,000, and destroyed 85 percent of the city's structures. Among several important buildings of the city, the Ribeira Palace and the Hospital Real de Todos os Santos were lost. In coastal areas, such as Peniche, situated about 80 km (50 mi) north of Lisbon, many people were killed by the following tsunami.

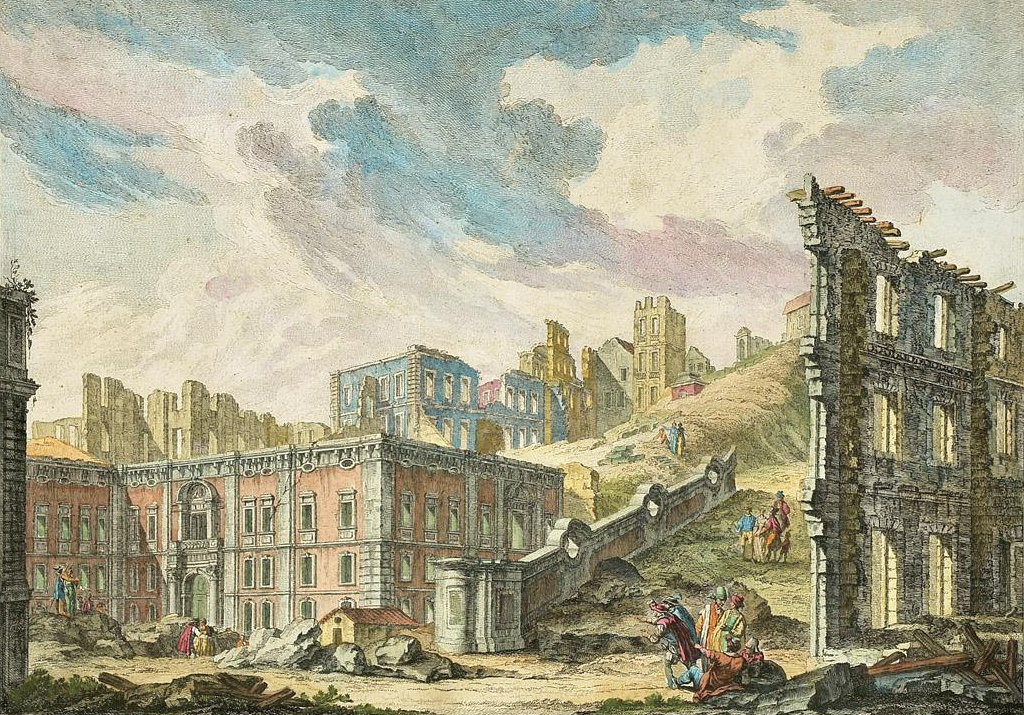
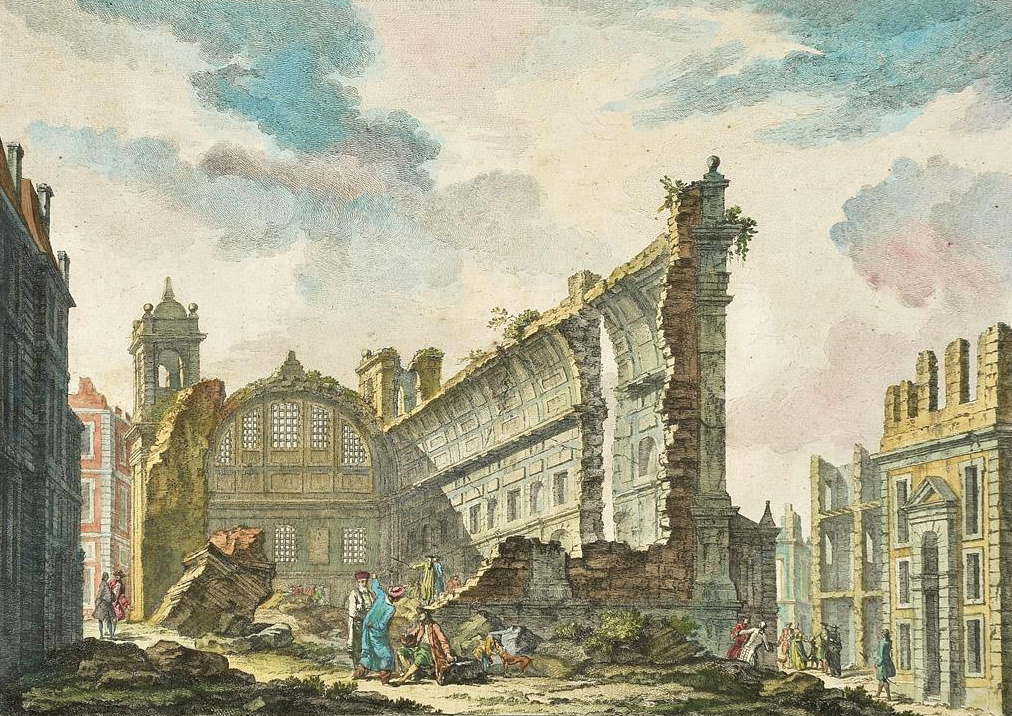
The 1755 Lisbon earthquake devastated Lisbon with an estimated magnitude between 8.5 and 9.0.

By 1755, Lisbon was one of the largest cities in Europe; the catastrophic event shocked the whole of Europe and left a deep impression on its collective psyche. Voltaire wrote a long poem, Poème sur le désastre de Lisbonne, shortly after the quake, and mentioned it in his 1759 novel Candide (indeed, many argue that this critique of optimism was inspired by that earthquake). Oliver Wendell Holmes Sr. also mentions it in his 1857 poem, The Deacon's Masterpiece, or The Wonderful One-Hoss Shay.

After the 1755 earthquake, the city was rebuilt largely according to the plans of Prime Minister Sebastião José de Carvalho e Melo, the 1st Marquis of Pombal; the lower town began to be known as the Baixa Pombalina (Pombaline central district). Instead of rebuilding the medieval town, Pombal decided to demolish what remained after the earthquake and rebuild the city centre in accordance with principles of modern urban design. It was reconstructed in an open rectangular plan with two great squares: the Praça do Rossio and the Praça do Comércio. The first, the central commercial district, is the traditional gathering place of the city and the location of the older cafés, theatres and restaurants; the second became the city's main access to the River Tagus and point of departure and arrival for seagoing vessels, adorned by a triumphal arch (1873) and a monument to King Joseph I.

=== Modern era ===
The Palace of Ajuda was built as a residence for the King of Portugal following the 1755 Lisbon Earthquake

In the first years of the 19th century, Portugal was invaded by the troops of Napoléon Bonaparte, forcing Queen Maria I and Prince-Regent John (future John VI) to flee temporarily to Brazil. The capital of the United Kingdom of Portugal, Brazil and the Algarves was located in Rio de Janeiro from 1808 to 1821. By the time the new King returned to Lisbon, many of the buildings and properties were pillaged, sacked or destroyed by the invaders.

During the 19th century, the Liberal movement introduced new changes into the urban landscape. The principal areas were in the Baixa and along the Chiado district, where shops, tobacconists shops, cafés, bookstores, clubs and theatres proliferated. The development of industry and commerce determined the growth of the city, seeing the transformation of the Passeio Público, a Pombaline era park, into the Avenida da Liberdade, as the city grew farther from the Tagus.

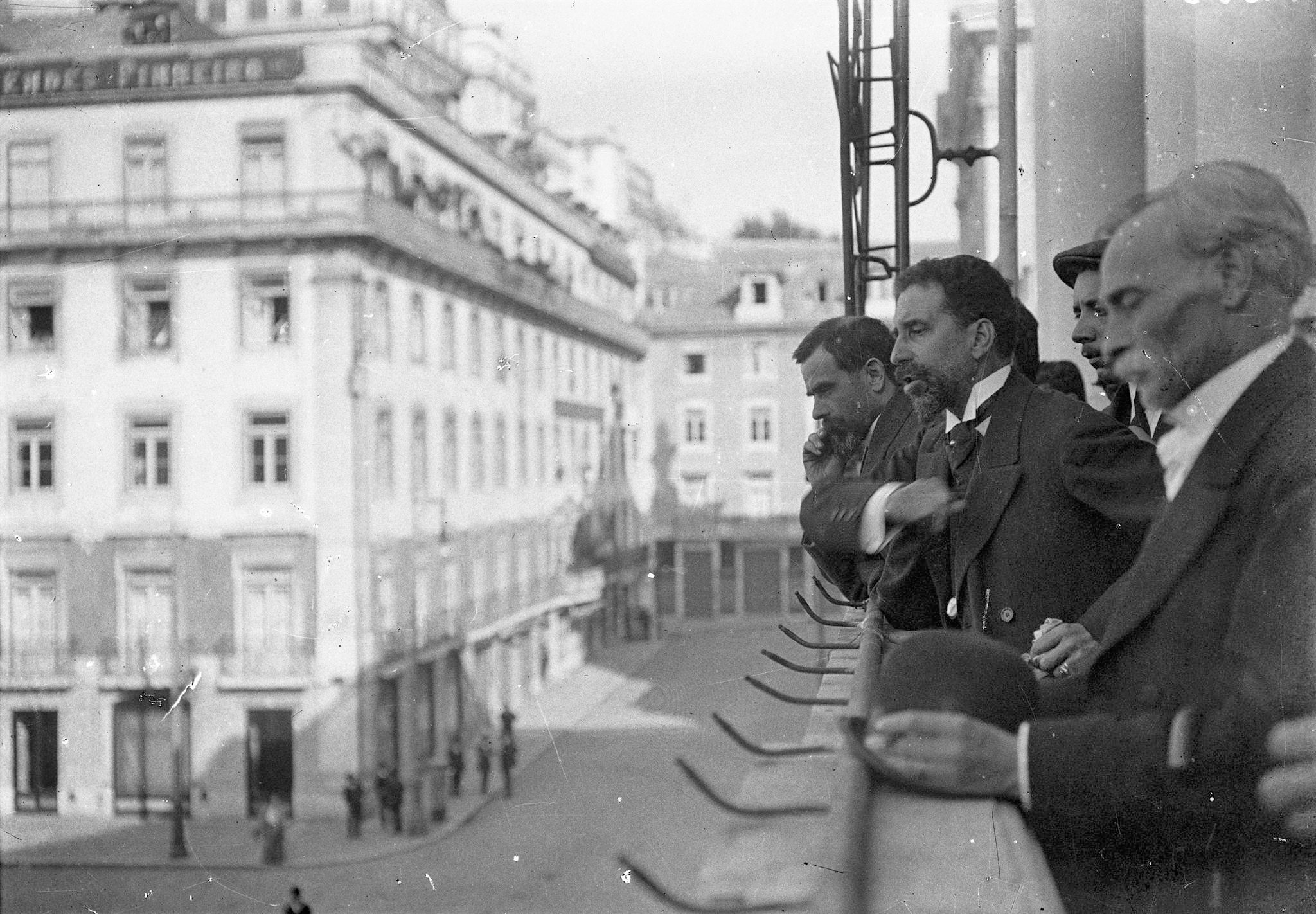
The Proclamation of the Portuguese Republic in 1910

Lisbon was the site of the regicide of Carlos I of Portugal in 1908, an event which culminated two years later with the 5 October 1910 revolution, brought an end to the Portuguese monarchy and established the highly unstable and corrupt Portuguese First Republic.

The city refounded its university in 1911 after centuries of inactivity in Lisbon, incorporating reformed former colleges and other non-university higher education schools of the city (such as the Escola Politécnica, now Faculdade de Ciências). Today, there are two public universities in the city (University of Lisbon and New University of Lisbon), a public university institute (ISCTE - Lisbon University Institute) and a polytechnic institute (IPL – Instituto Politécnico de Lisboa).

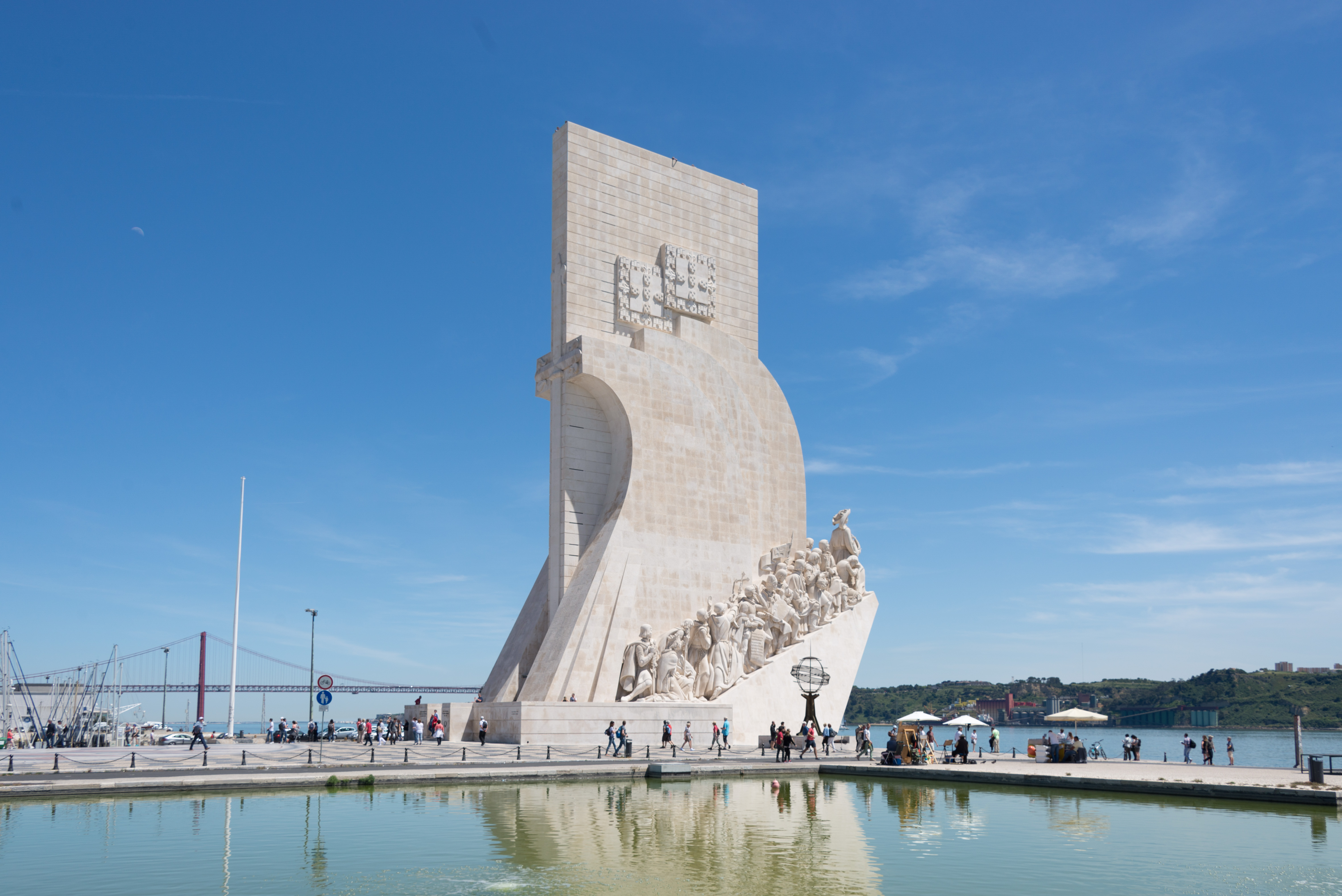
Monument of the Discoveries was built for the 1940 Portuguese World Exhibition.

The city was also the site where the 28 May 1926 coup d'état ended the first republic and firmly established the Estado Novo, or the Portuguese Second Republic, as the ruling regime. During the Estado Novo regime (1926–1974), Lisbon, under the influence of Duarte Pacheco, the minister of works, was expanded at the cost of other districts within the country, resulting in nationalist and monumental projects.

New residential and public developments were constructed; the zone of Belém was modified for the 1940 Portuguese Exhibition, while along the periphery new districts appeared to house the growing population. The inauguration of the bridge over the Tagus allowed a rapid connection between both sides of the river.

During World War II, Lisbon was one of the very few neutral, open European Atlantic ports, a major gateway for refugees to the U.S. and a haven for spies. More than 100,000 refugees were able to flee Nazi Germany via Lisbon.

=== Contemporary ===
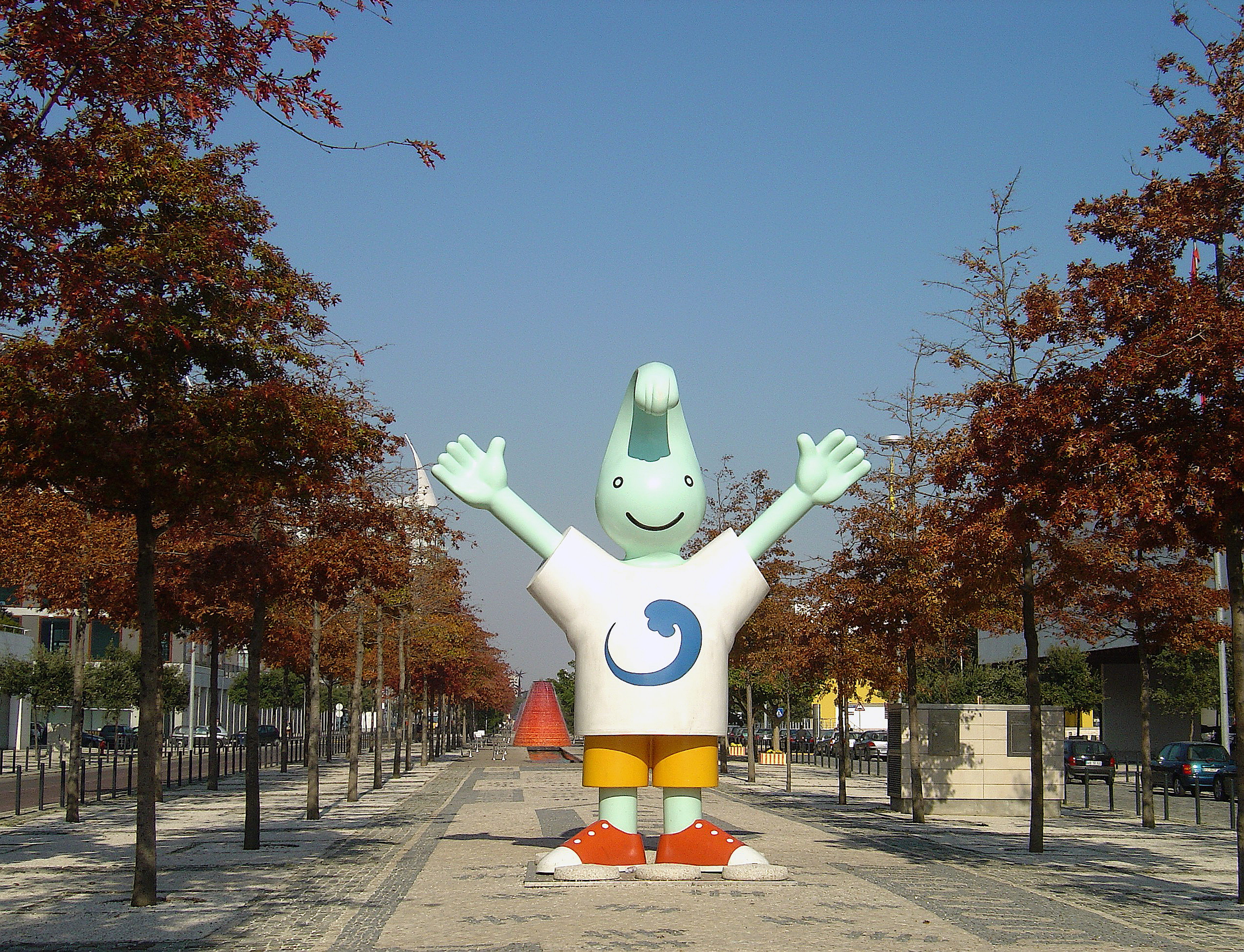
Lisbon's Expo '98 mascot, "Gil".

The Carnation Revolution, which took place on 25 April 1974, ended the right-wing Estado Novo regime and reformed the country to its current state as the Portuguese Third Republic.

In the 1990s, many of the districts were renovated and projects in the historic quarters were established to modernise those areas. Architectural and patrimonial buildings were renovated, the northern margin of the Tagus was re-purposed for leisure and residential use, the Vasco da Gama Bridge was constructed and the eastern part of the municipality was re-purposed for Expo '98 to commemorate the 500th anniversary of Vasco da Gama's sea voyage to India, which brought immense riches to Lisbon and led to the construction of many of Lisbon's landmarks.

In 1988, a fire in the historical district of Chiado saw the destruction of many 18th-century Pombaline style buildings. A series of restoration works has brought the area back to its former self and made it a high-scale shopping district.

The Lisbon Agenda was a European Union agreement on measures to revitalise the EU economy, signed in Lisbon in March 2000. In October 2007 Lisbon hosted the 2007 EU Summit, where an agreement was reached regarding a new EU governance model. The resulting Treaty of Lisbon was signed on 13 December 2007 and came into force on 1 December 2009.

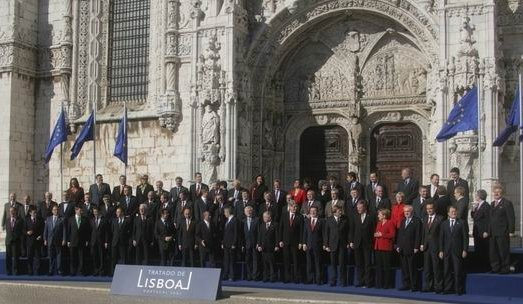
The Treaty of Lisbon, which forms the constitutional basis of the European Union, was signed at the Jerónimos Monastery in 2007.

Lisbon has been the site for many international events and programmes. In 1994, Lisbon was the European Capital of Culture. On 3 November 2005, Lisbon hosted the MTV European Music Awards. On 7 July 2007, Lisbon held the ceremony of the "New 7 Wonders Of The World" election, in the Luz Stadium, with live transmission for millions of people all over the world. Every two years, Lisbon hosts the Rock in Rio Lisboa Music Festival, one of the largest in the world. Lisbon hosted the NATO summit (19–20 November 2010), a summit meeting that is regarded as a periodic opportunity for Heads of State and Heads of Government of NATO member states to evaluate and provide strategic direction for Alliance activities. The city hosts the Web Summit and is the head office for the Group of Seven Plus (G7+). In 2018 it hosted the Eurovision Song Contest for the first time as well as the Michelin Gala. On 11 July 2018, the Aga Khan officially chose the Henrique de Mendonça Palace, located on Rua Marquês de Fronteira, as the Divan, or seat, of the global Nizari Muslim Imamate. Lisbon hosted World Youth Day 2023 in August of that year, attracting Catholic youth from the around the world. Pope Francis led several events, with the final mass held in the city's Parque do Tejo having an estimated 1.5 million attendees.

== Geography ==
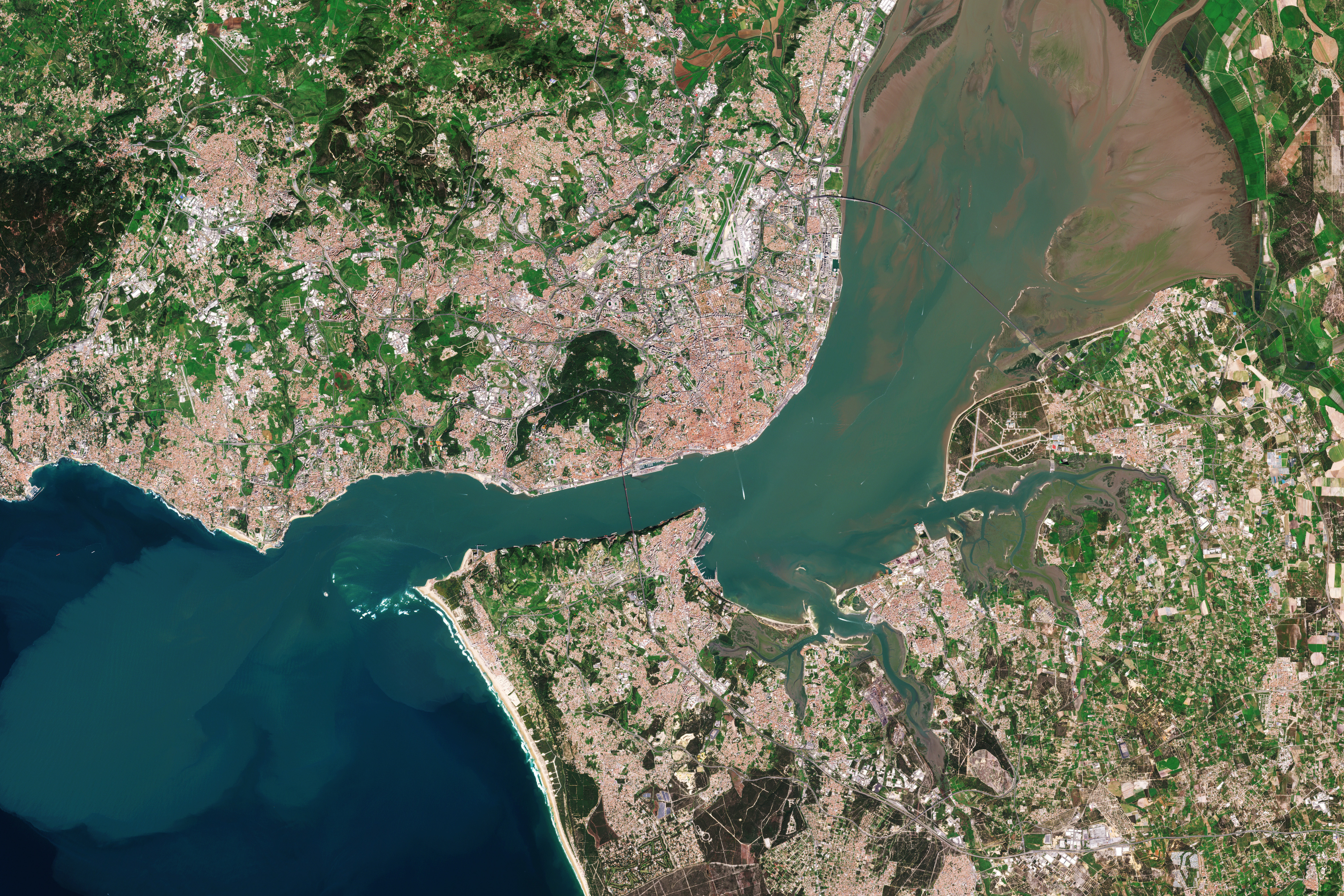
View of the Lisbon metropolitan area, with the Portuguese Riviera to the west of Lisbon and the Setúbal Peninsula south of the Tagus River

City center areas overlooking the railway tracks at Cais do Sodré and the ferry services on the Tagus River

Map of the 24 freguesias (administrative divisions of the city) of Lisbon grouped by zone: Historic Centre Western Lisbon Central Lisbon Eastern Lisbon Northern Lisbon

=== Physical geography ===
Lisbon is located at 38°42′49.75″N 9°8′21.79″W, situated at the mouth of the Tagus River and is the westernmost capital of a mainland European country. The river delta is inverted.

The westernmost part of Lisbon is occupied by the Monsanto Forest Park, a ten-square-kilometre urban park, one of the largest in Europe, which takes up 10% of the municipality.

The city occupies an area of 100.05 km^{2} (39 sq mi); its city boundaries, unlike those of most major cities, coincide with those of the municipality. The rest of the urbanised area of the Lisbon urban area, known generically as Greater Lisbon (Portuguese: Grande Lisboa) includes several administratively defined cities and municipalities, in the north bank of the Tagus River. The larger Lisbon metropolitan area includes the Setúbal Peninsula to the south.

=== Climate ===
Lisbon has a Mediterranean climate (Köppen: Csa), characterised by mild, rainy winters and warm to hot, dry summers. The average annual temperature is 17.6 °C (63.7 °F), with average daily highs of 21.7 °C (71.1 °F) and lows of 13.6 °C (56.5 °F).

In the coldest month, January, daytime highs typically range from 14 to 19 °C (57 to 66 °F), while nighttime lows range from 5 to 10 °C (41 to 50 °F), with an average sea temperature of 16 °C (61 °F). In the warmest month, August, daytime highs typically range from 25 to 32 °C (77 to 90 °F), nighttime lows range from 14 to 20 °C (57 to 68 °F), and the average sea temperature is about 20 °C (68 °F).

The climate of Lisbon is moderate, largely due to its location in southwestern Europe, its proximity to the Azores High and the Atlantic Ocean. The highest temperature ever recorded in Lisbon was 44.0 °C (111.2 °F) on 4 August 2018, while the lowest temperature ever recorded was −1.5 °C (29 °F) on February 15, 1860; although other locations in its metropolitan area have recorded lower temperatures, not being as affected by the urban heat island effect of the city centre, with Sintra and Setúbal having reached −4 °C (25 °F) and −5.1 °C (22.8 °F), respectively, both experiencing about 13 days of frost per year on average.

Lisbon receives about 793 mm (31.2 in) of precipitation annually, with the majority falling during the autumn and winter months. November and December are the wettest months, contributing to a third of the total annual rainfall. The dry season typically lasts from early June to mid-September, with July and August being the driest months. During this period, there are typically about 8 days with measurable precipitation.

The city has about 2,875 hours of sunshine per year, one of the highest amounts in Europe. August is the sunniest month, with sunshine occurring for approximately 80% of the daytime, while December is the dullest, with sunshine occurring only 51% of the time.

Temperatures across Lisbon's metropolitan area can vary significantly, especially during the summer months. In areas with greater exposure to the Atlantic Ocean, such as Sintra or Cascais to the west of the city, temperatures tend to be more moderate and are generally cooler. In extreme cases, summer daytime highs can differ by as much as 20 °C (68 °F) between the city of Lisbon and Cabo da Roca.

Climate data for Lisbon (Instituto Geofísico D. Luís) (1991–2020 normals, extremes 1854–present)
| Month | Jan | Feb | Mar | Apr | May | Jun | Jul | Aug | Sep | Oct | Nov | Dec | Year |
|---|---|---|---|---|---|---|---|---|---|---|---|---|---|
| Record high °C (°F) | 22.6 (72.7) | 25.4 (77.7) | 29.4 (84.9) | 32.4 (90.3) | 35.1 (95.2) | 41.5 (106.7) | 40.6 (105.1) | 44.0 (111.2) | 42.0 (107.6) | 35.3 (95.5) | 27.8 (82.0) | 23.2 (73.8) | 44.0 (111.2) |
| Mean maximum °C (°F) | 19.1 (66.4) | 20.9 (69.6) | 24.8 (76.6) | 26.9 (80.4) | 30.8 (87.4) | 34.9 (94.8) | 36.8 (98.2) | 37.2 (99.0) | 34.5 (94.1) | 29.3 (84.7) | 22.0 (71.6) | 19.2 (66.6) | 38.4 (101.1) |
| Mean daily maximum °C (°F) | 15.1 (59.2) | 16.4 (61.5) | 18.9 (66.0) | 20.4 (68.7) | 23.1 (73.6) | 26.1 (79.0) | 28.2 (82.8) | 28.8 (83.8) | 26.6 (79.9) | 22.8 (73.0) | 18.1 (64.6) | 15.4 (59.7) | 21.7 (71.0) |
| Daily mean °C (°F) | 11.8 (53.2) | 12.8 (55.0) | 14.9 (58.8) | 16.3 (61.3) | 18.8 (65.8) | 21.5 (70.7) | 23.2 (73.8) | 23.8 (74.8) | 22.1 (71.8) | 19.1 (66.4) | 15.0 (59.0) | 12.4 (54.3) | 17.6 (63.7) |
| Mean daily minimum °C (°F) | 8.6 (47.5) | 9.1 (48.4) | 11.0 (51.8) | 12.3 (54.1) | 14.4 (57.9) | 16.8 (62.2) | 18.2 (64.8) | 18.8 (65.8) | 17.6 (63.7) | 15.3 (59.5) | 11.8 (53.2) | 9.4 (48.9) | 13.6 (56.5) |
| Mean minimum °C (°F) | 4.5 (40.1) | 5.4 (41.7) | 6.8 (44.2) | 8.3 (46.9) | 10.9 (51.6) | 13.5 (56.3) | 15.2 (59.4) | 15.6 (60.1) | 14.3 (57.7) | 11.8 (53.2) | 8.1 (46.6) | 5.6 (42.1) | 3.6 (38.5) |
| Record low °C (°F) | −0.8 (30.6) | −1.5 (29.3) | 0.2 (32.4) | 4.4 (39.9) | 6.4 (43.5) | 10.2 (50.4) | 12.1 (53.8) | 13.3 (55.9) | 10.3 (50.5) | 7.7 (45.9) | 3.6 (38.5) | 0.4 (32.7) | −1.5 (29.3) |
| Average precipitation mm (inches) | 103.8 (4.09) | 77.8 (3.06) | 68.7 (2.70) | 71.8 (2.83) | 57.8 (2.28) | 14.1 (0.56) | 2.6 (0.10) | 5.4 (0.21) | 38.6 (1.52) | 110.6 (4.35) | 133.9 (5.27) | 108.5 (4.27) | 793.6 (31.24) |
| Average precipitation days (≥ 1 mm) | 10.0 | 7.9 | 7.6 | 7.9 | 5.8 | 2.0 | 0.6 | 1.1 | 3.8 | 8.7 | 9.9 | 10.0 | 75.3 |
| Average relative humidity (%) | 80.5 | 78.3 | 76.9 | 76.8 | 74.8 | 75.3 | 75.2 | 74.8 | 76.3 | 79.2 | 79.7 | 81.5 | 77.4 |
| Mean monthly sunshine hours | 158.6 | 174.7 | 216.0 | 248.0 | 296.8 | 322.2 | 349.7 | 339.9 | 259.8 | 196.4 | 163.1 | 149.7 | 2,874.9 |
| Percentage possible sunshine | 52 | 57 | 58 | 63 | 67 | 73 | 77 | 81 | 70 | 57 | 54 | 51 | 63 |
Source 1: Instituto Português do Mar e da Atmosfera, German Meteorological Service (sunshine hours 1990–2019)
Source 2: Weather.Directory

=== Freguesias ===
The municipality of Lisbon included 53 freguesias until November 2012. A new law ("Lei n.º 56/2012") reduced the number of freguesias to the following 24:

- Ajuda
- Alcântara
- Alvalade
- Areeiro
- Arroios
- Avenidas Novas
- Beato
- Belém
- Benfica
- Campo de Ourique
- Campolide
- Carnide
- Estrela
- Lumiar
- Marvila
- Misericórdia
- Olivais
- Parque das Nações
- Penha de França
- Santa Clara
- Santa Maria Maior
- Santo António
- São Domingos de Benfica
- São Vicente

=== Neighbourhoods ===
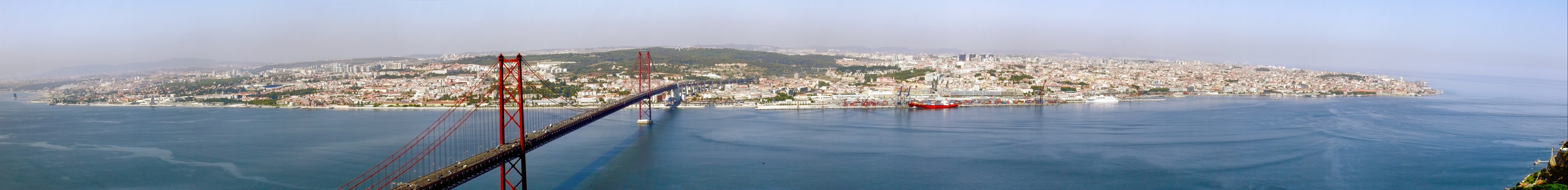
View of Lisbon's waterfront districts from the Christ the King viewpoint.

Locally, Lisbon's inhabitants may commonly refer to the spaces of Lisbon in terms of historic Bairros de Lisboa (neighbourhoods). These communities have no clearly defined boundaries and represent distinctive quarters of the city that have in common a historical culture, similar living standards, and identifiable architectural landmarks, as exemplified by the Bairro Alto, Alfama, Chiado, and so forth.

==== Alcântara ====
Santo Amaro, Alcântara

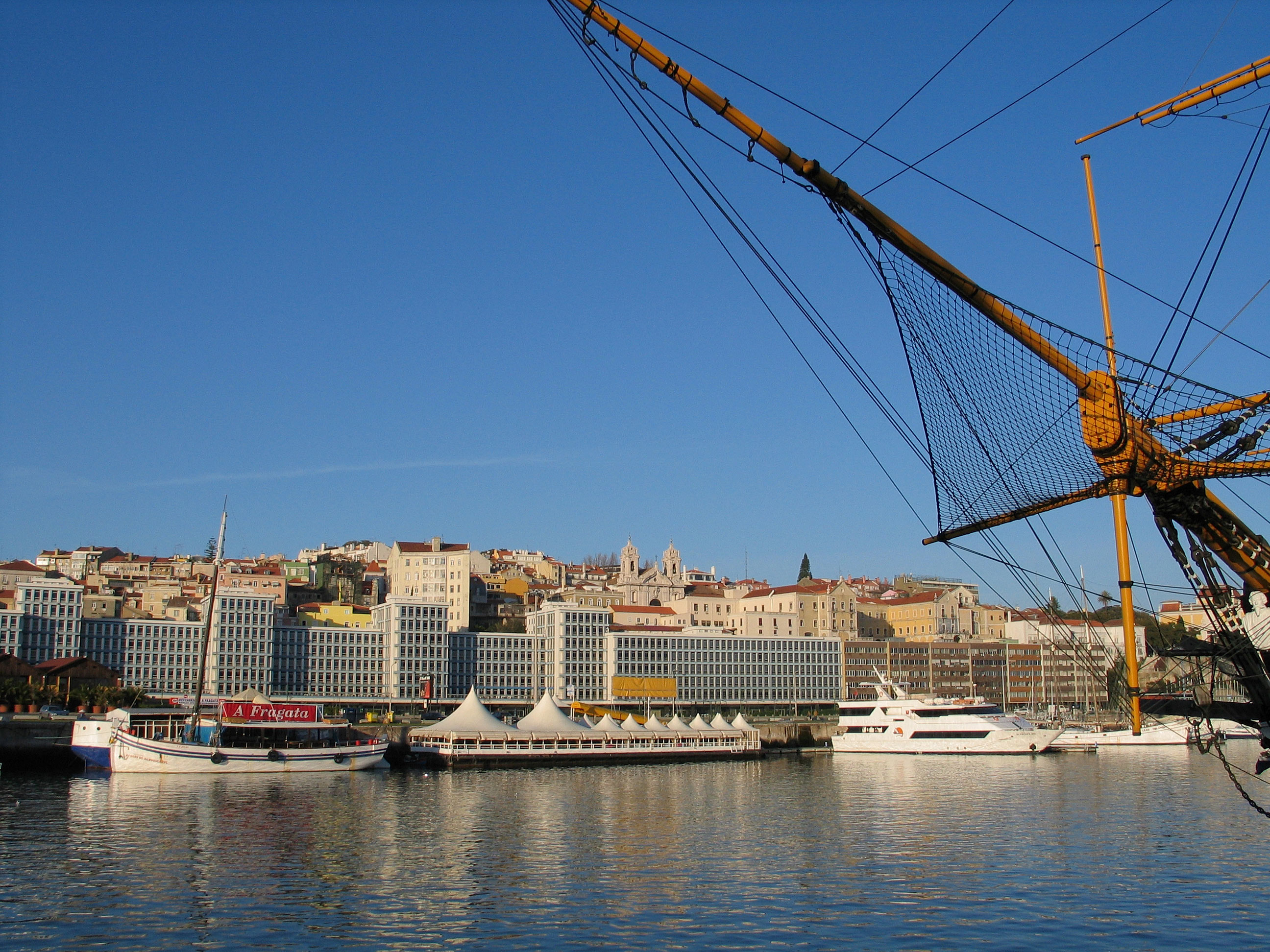
Alcântara from the Port of Lisbon

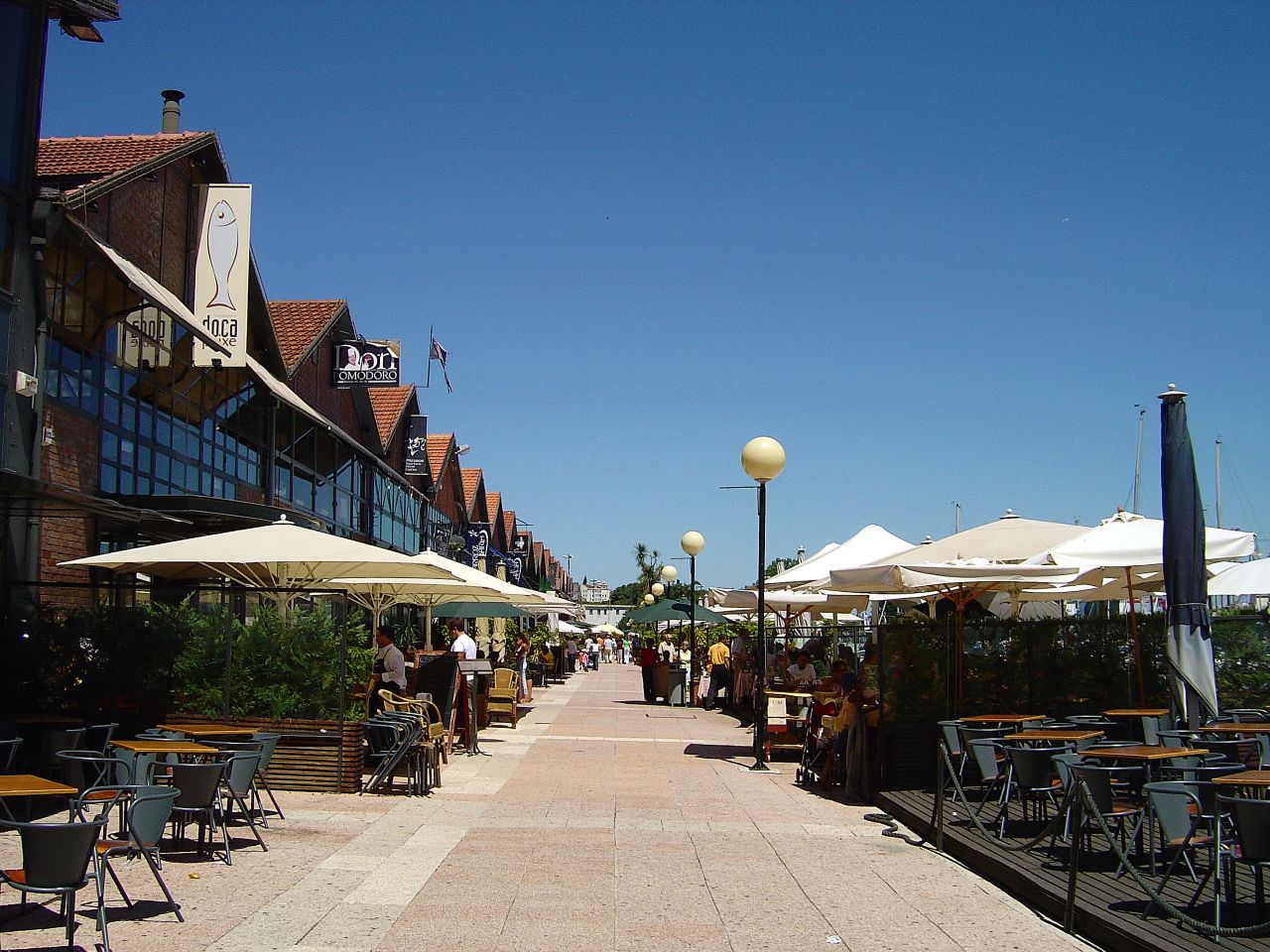
Lisbon "docas"

Alcântara is situated along the northern bank of the Tagus River, between the parishes of Belém to the west and Estrela to the east. Its proximity to both the city centre and the riverside makes it a well-connected and popular area for both locals and tourists. Although today it is quite central, it was once a mere suburb of Lisbon, comprising mostly farms and country estates of the nobility with their palaces. Amongst the palaces found in the neighbourhood the most notable are:

- Palácio da Ega (16th century), now hosting the Arquivo Histórico Ultramarino
- Palácio Condes da Ribeira Grande (18th century), now hosting the MACAM museum and an hotel
- Palácio Burnay (18th century), now in the process of being restored so as to house a state-owned enterprise focused on culture
- Palacete do Conde de Burnay (19th century), now housing a public library (biblioteca de Alcântara)
- Palácio Vale-Flor (20th century), nowadays a restaurant and an hotel

In the 16th century, there was a brook there which the nobles used to promenade in their boats.

During the late 19th and early 20th centuries, Alcântara became a popular industrial area, with many small factories and warehouses and docks along the waterfront. The presence of these industries attracted many working-class families.

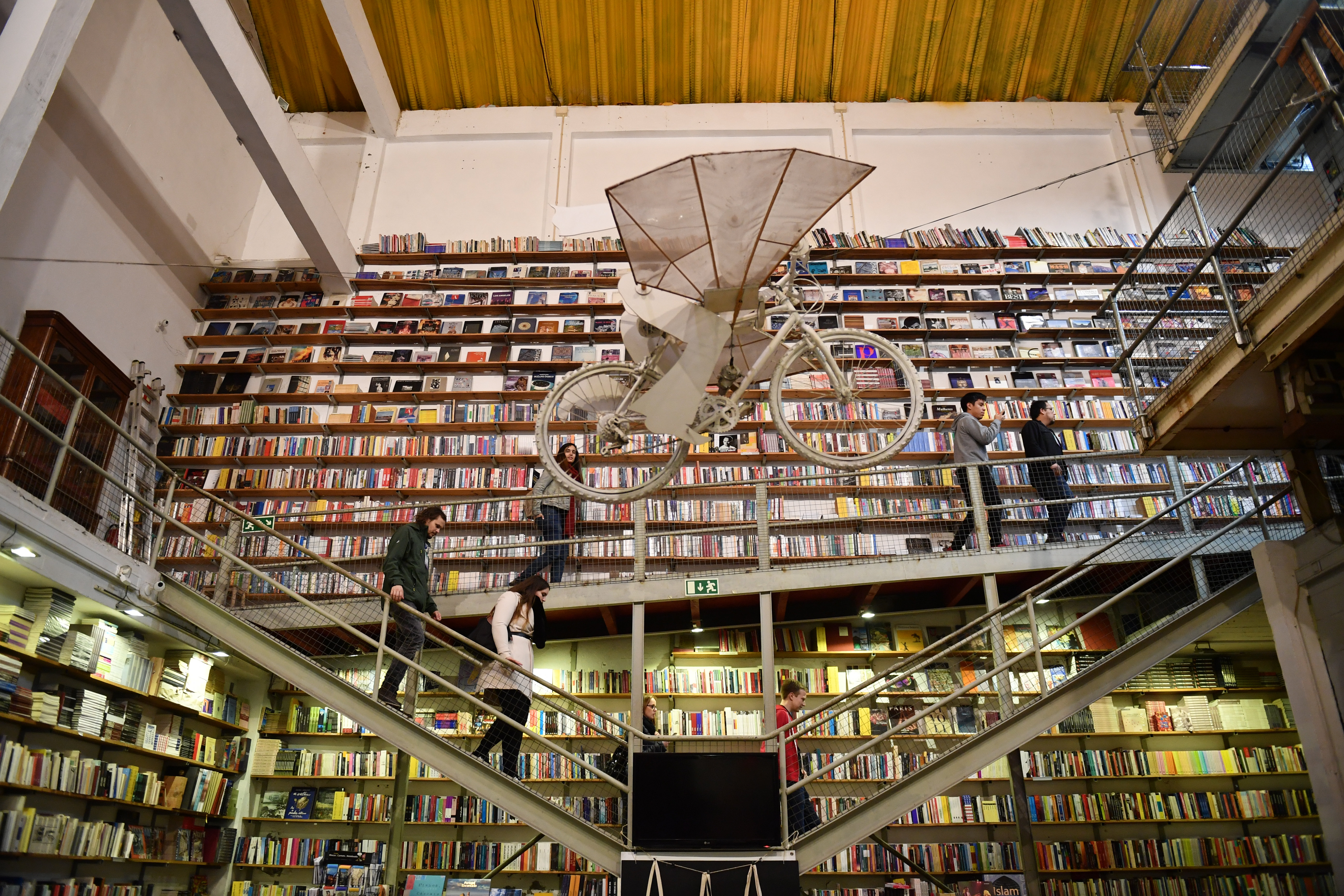
Lx Factory in Alcântara

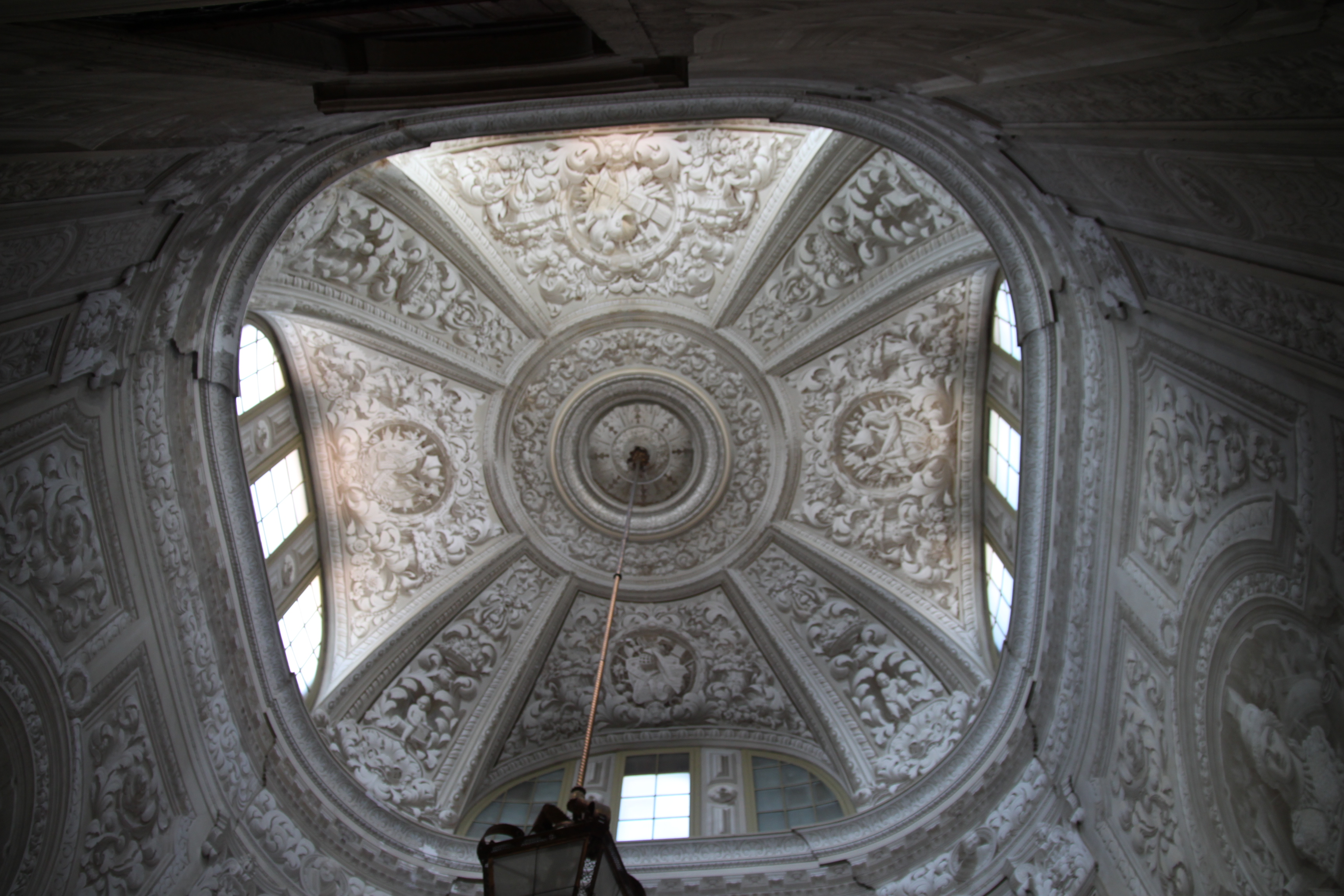
Palácio Burnay, Alcântara

By the mid-20th century, the area had experienced some decline as industries closed down. However, since the late 20th century, Alcântara has seen revitalisation, with many of the old factories repurposed into trendy spaces such as art galleries, nightclubs, and creative hubs. In the early 1990s, Alcântara began to attract youth because of the number of pubs and discothèques. This was mainly due to its outer area of mostly commercial buildings, which acted as barriers to the noise-generating nightlife (which acted as a buffer to the residential communities surrounding it). In the meantime, some of these areas began to become gentrified, attracting loft developments and new flats, which have profited from its river views and central location.

Alcântara has emerged as one of Lisbon's most dynamic areas for nightlife and culture. The riverfront of Alcântara is known for its nightclubs and bars. The area is commonly known as docas (docks), since most of the clubs and bars are housed in converted dock warehouses.

Key places of interest/cultural landmarks in the neighbourhood include:

- LX Factory: A cultural and creative complex housed in a former industrial site now home to cafes, restaurants, co-working spaces, shops, and art installations. LX Factory frequently hosts markets, exhibitions, and live performances
- Village Underground: An innovative cultural space made of recycled shipping containers and old buses, used as offices, restaurants, and even a stage for performances. It exemplifies the creative reuse of industrial spaces in Alcântara.
- Museums: Many museums can be found in Alcantara, including the "Museu de Macau" (Macau Museum), "Museu da Carris" (Carris - Public transportation museum), the "B-Mad museum" (Berardo - Museum Art Deco) and the set-to-open in 2024 MACAM (Armando Martins Museum of Contemporary Art)
- Pilar 7: Situated within one of the massive support pillars of the 25 de Abril Bridge. It was created to offer visitors a closer look at the bridge's architectural and engineering marvel, providing access to areas of the bridge that would otherwise be off-limits. The main focus is on the structural aspects and construction of the bridge, but it also incorporates interactive exhibits and a viewpoint.

The neighbourhood is also noticeable for hosting the "Lisbon Congress Centre" (Centro de congressos de Lisboa), the Lisbon Metropolitan Orchestra (Orquestra Metropolitana de Lisboa) and the Arquivo Histórico Ultramarino.

==== Alfama ====
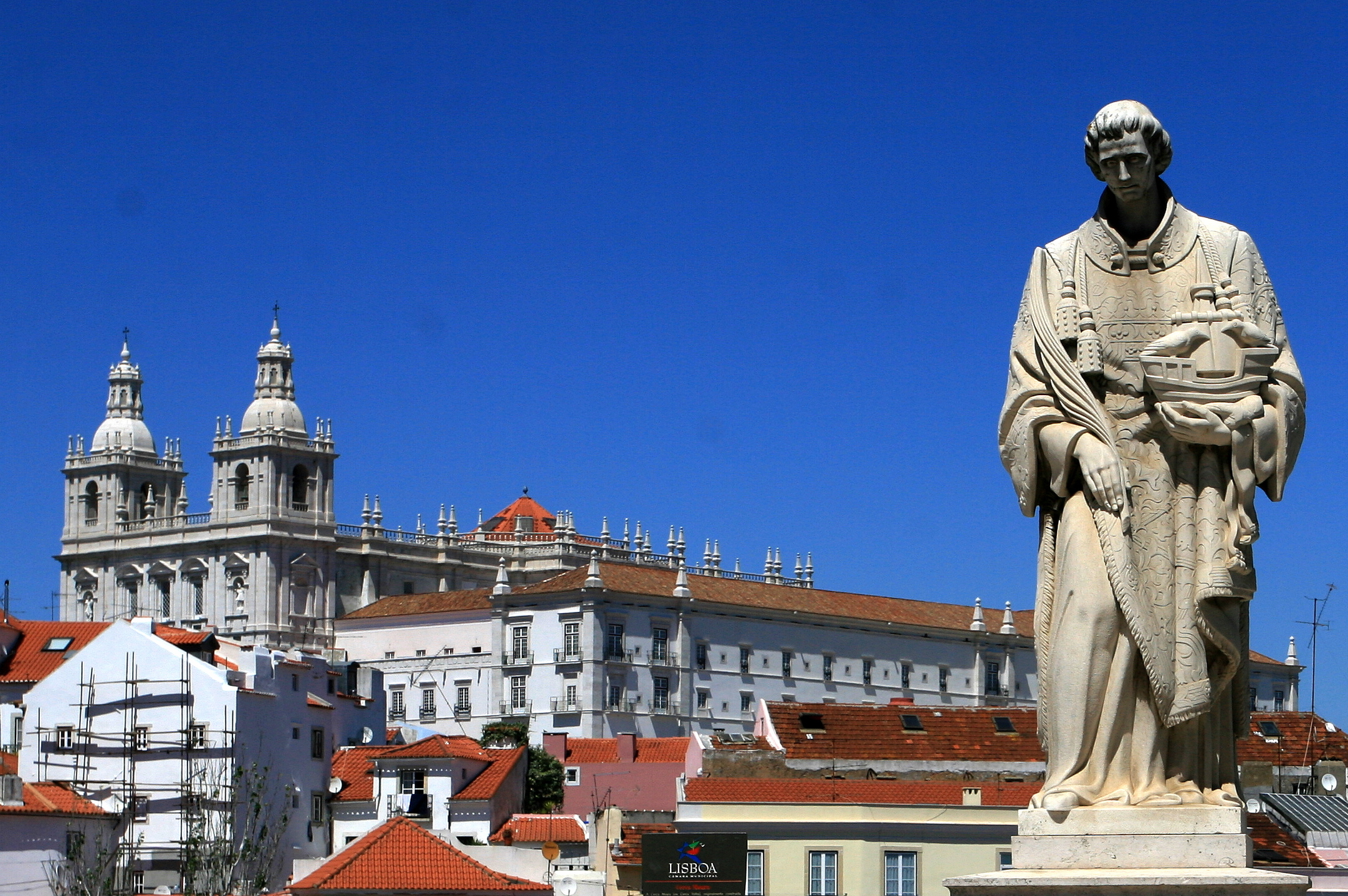
Alfama, with the church of S. Vicente de Fora.

Alfama, the oldest district of Lisbon, spreads down the southern slope from the Castle of São Jorge to the River Tagus. Its name, derived from the Arabic Al-hamma, means fountains or baths. During the Islamic invasion of Iberia, the Alfama constituted the largest part of the city, extending west to the Baixa neighbourhood. Increasingly, the Alfama became inhabited by fishermen and the poor: its fame as a poor neighbourhood continues to this day. Many of the buildings date back to the 18th century, showcasing traditional Portuguese architecture, complete with colorful tiled facades and wrought-iron balconies. While the 1755 Lisbon earthquake caused considerable damage throughout the capital, the Alfama was largely spared and survived with little damage, thanks to its compact labyrinth of narrow streets and small squares.

This historic district has retained much of its original character. It is a historical quarter of mixed-use buildings occupied by Fado bars, restaurants, and homes with small shops downstairs. Fado, the typically Portuguese style of melancholy music, is common (but not obligatory) in the restaurants of the district.

Alfama hosts several events throughout the year, including the popular Festas de Santo António, where locals celebrate with street parties, music, and food.

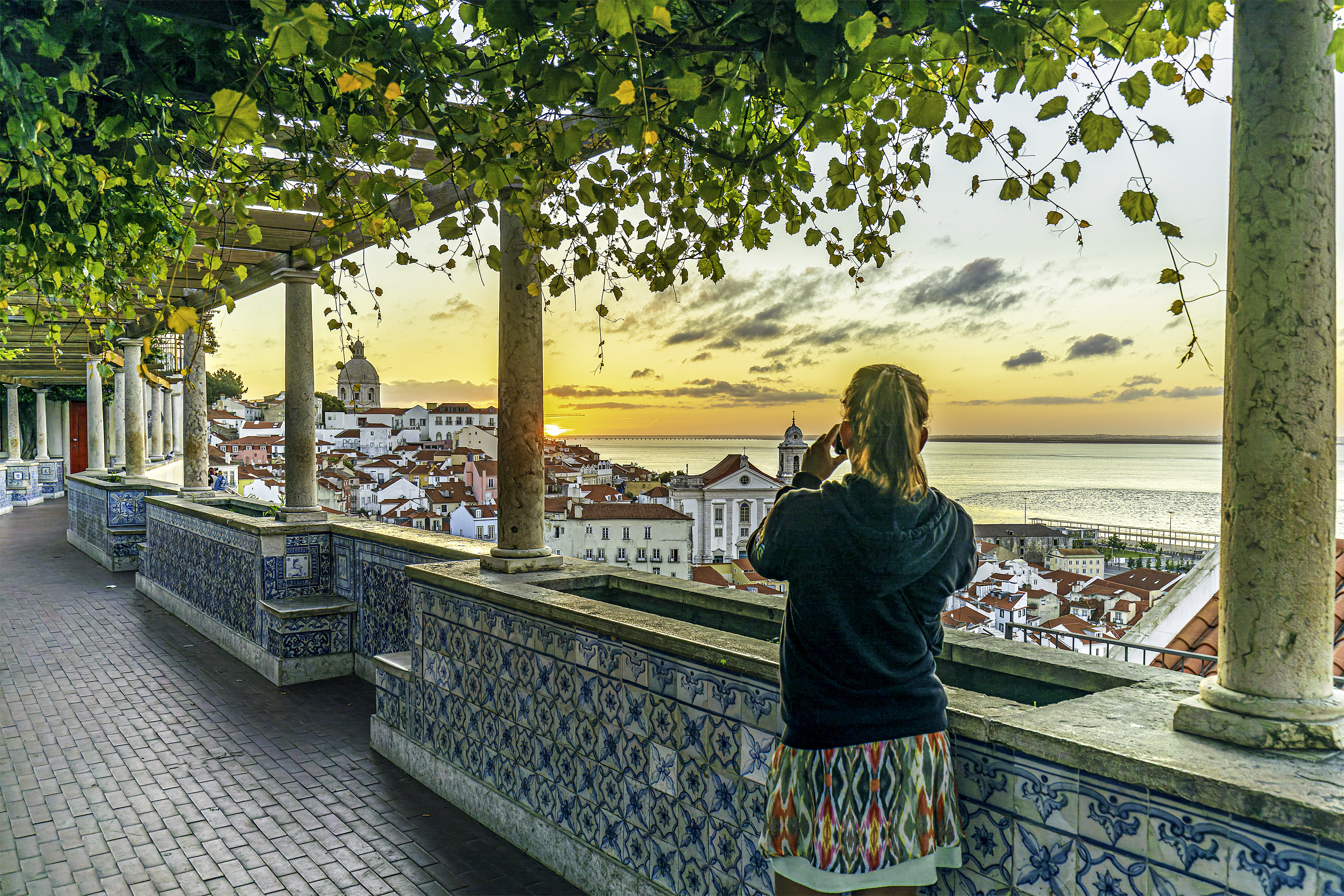
Miradouro de Santa Luzia, in the Alfama district, at sunrise.

Places of interest and cultural landmarks in the neighbourhood include:

- São Jorge Castle: historic castle which has been continuously occupied for the last 3,000 years
- Miradouros: Amongst the most emblematic viewpoints there are Miradouro de Santa Luzia (where the Igreja de Santa Luzia e de São Brás stands) and the Miradouro das Portas do Sol.
- Museums: Many museums can be found in Alfama, including the "Museu de Santo António" (Saint Anthony Museum), "Museu do Aljube - Resistência e Liberdade" (Aljube - Estado Novo dictatorship museum), the "Museu do Teatro Romano" (Roman Theatre Museum), the "Fundação José Saramago" (José Saramago Foundation) and the "Museu de Artes Decorativas Portuguesas" (Museum of Portuguese Decorative Arts)

==== Mouraria ====
The Mouraria, or Moorish quarter, is one of the most traditional neighbourhoods of Lisbon, although most of its old buildings were demolished by the Estado Novo between the 1930s and the 1970s. It takes its name from the fact that after the reconquest of Lisbon, the Muslims who remained were confined to this part of the city. In turn, the Jews were confined to three neighbourhoods called "Judiarias".

==== Bairro Alto ====
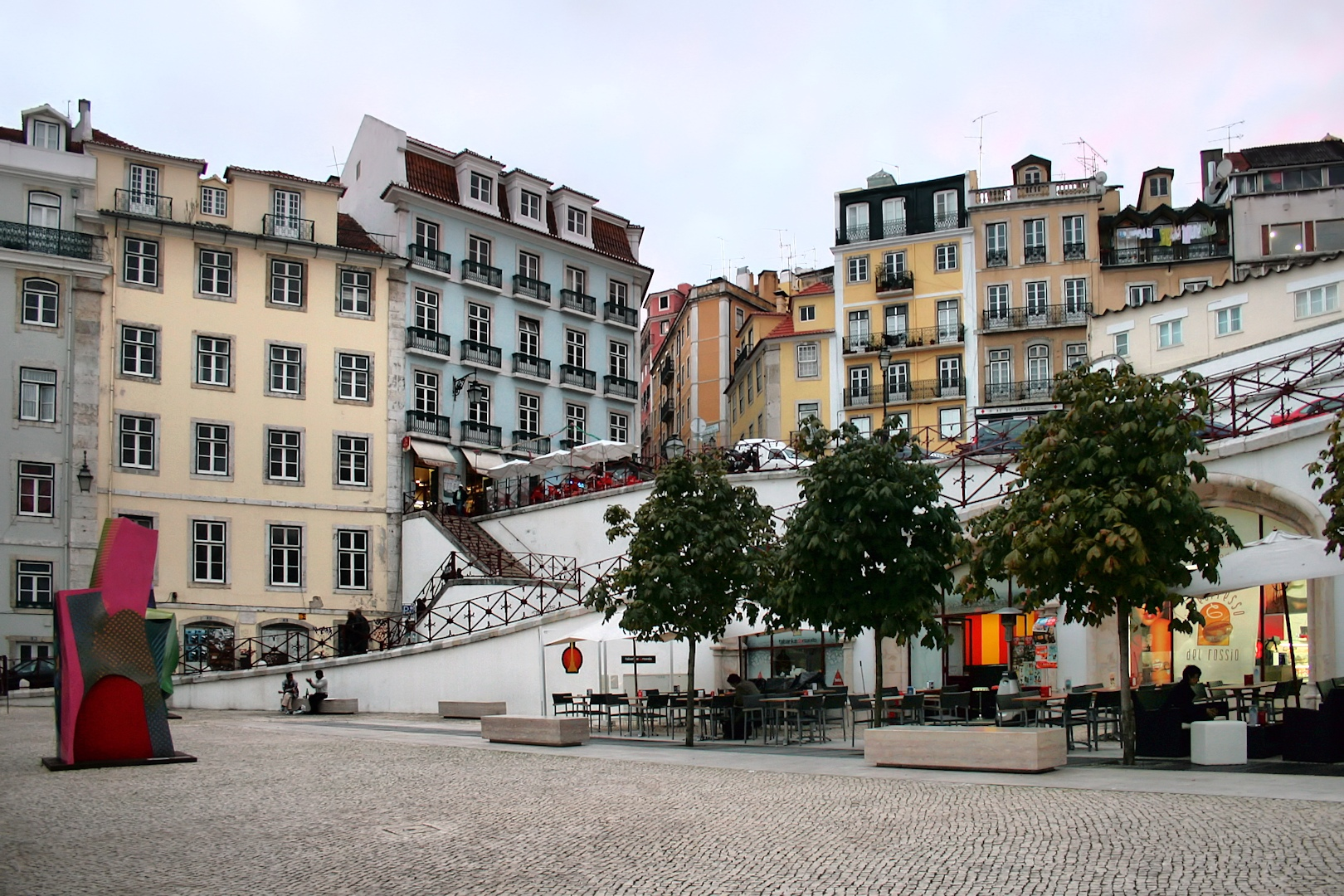
Duke of Cadaval Square, bordering Bairro Alto and the Baixa Pombalina

Bairro Alto (literally the upper quarter in Portuguese) is an area of central Lisbon that functions as a residential, shopping and entertainment district; it is the centre of the Portuguese capital's nightlife, attracting hipster youth and members of various music subcultures. Lisbon's punk, gay, metal, goth, hip-hop and reggae scenes all find a home in the Bairro with its many clubs and bars that cater to them. The crowds in the Bairro Alto are a multicultural mix of people representing a broad cross-section of modern Portuguese society, many of them being entertainment seekers and devotees of various music genres outside the mainstream. Fado, Portugal's national music, still survives in the midst of the new nightlife.

==== Baixa ====
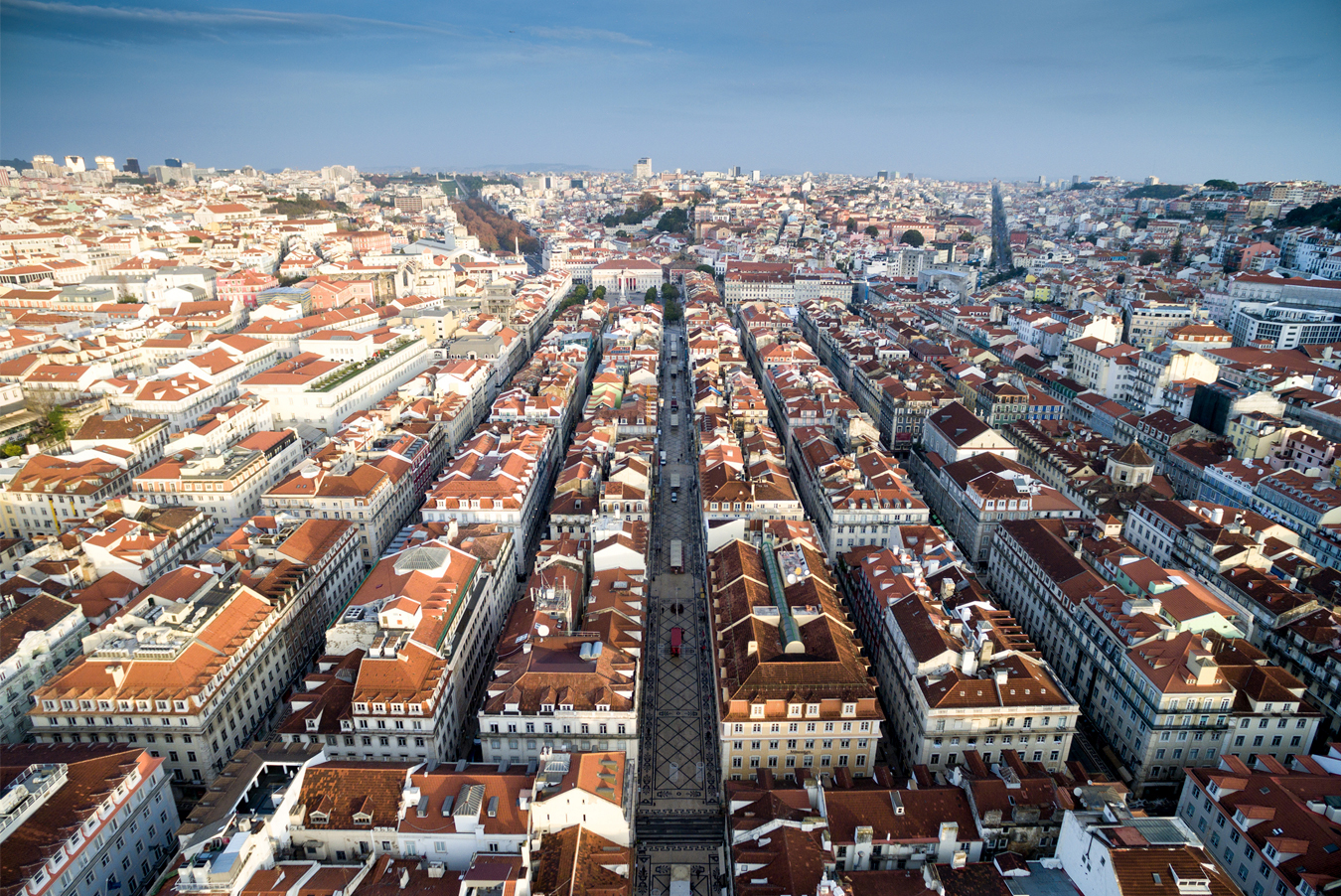
Aerial view of the Lisbon Baixa.

The heart of the city is the Baixa or city centre; the Pombaline Baixa is an elegant district, primarily constructed after the 1755 Lisbon earthquake. The district takes its name from its benefactor, Sebastião José de Carvalho e Melo, 1st Marquis of Pombal, who was the minister of Joseph I of Portugal (1750–1777) and a key figure of the Portuguese Enlightenment. Following the 1755 disaster, Pombal took the lead in rebuilding Lisbon, imposing strict conditions and guidelines on the construction of the city, and transforming the organic street plan that characterised the district before the earthquake into its current grid pattern. As a result, the Pombaline Baixa is one of the first examples of earthquake-resistant construction. Architectural models were tested by having troops march around them to simulate an earthquake. Notable features of Pombaline structures include the Pombaline cage, a symmetrical wood-lattice framework aimed at distributing earthquake forces, and inter-terrace walls that were built higher than roof timbers to inhibit the spread of fires.

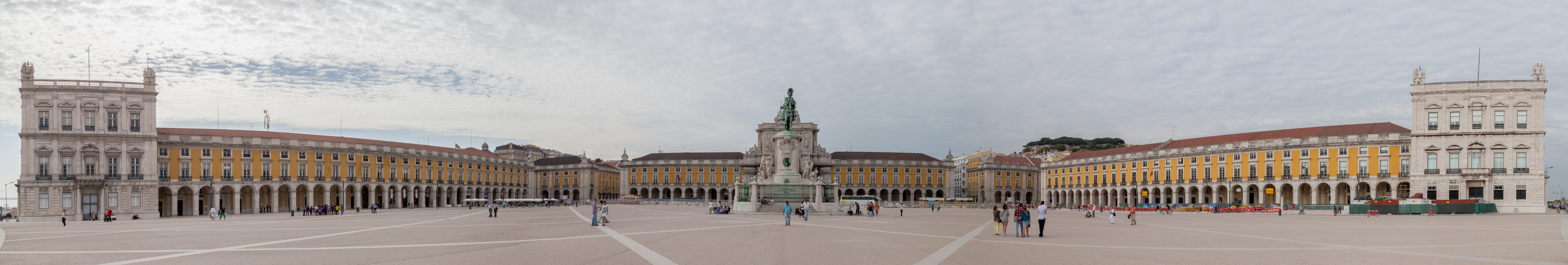
Praça do Comércio, with the Rua Augusta Arch, in the Lisbon Baixa

==== Beato ====
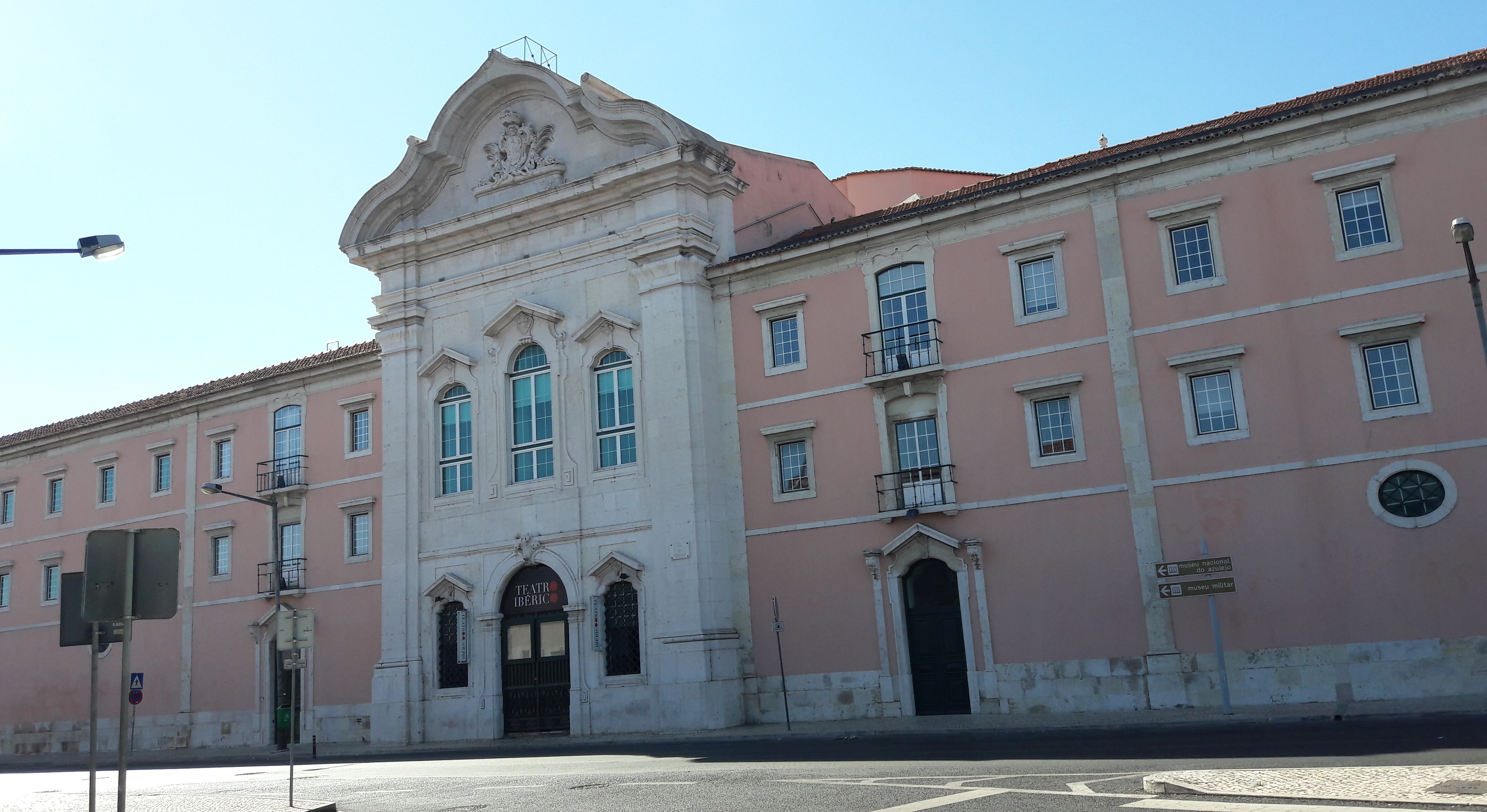
Facade of Teatro Ibérico, in Beato

The parish of Beato stands out for the cultural dynamics it has been experiencing in recent years. The manufacturing districts and the industrial facilities by the riverside docks are the place of choice for contemporary art galleries, iconic bars, and gourmet restaurants that simmer in the streets. This reality has not gone unnoticed by the national press, and Visão, TimeOut, or Jornal de Negócios have already made notice of this parish which contains the National Museum of the Azulejo or the Palacio do Grilo.

==== Belém ====
Belém is famous as the place from which many of the great Portuguese explorers set off on their voyages of discovery. In particular, it is the place from which Vasco da Gama departed for India in 1497 and Pedro Álvares Cabral departed for Brazil in 1499. It is also a former royal residence and features the 17th – 18th-century Belém Palace, a former royal residence now occupied by the President of Portugal, and the Ajuda Palace, begun in 1802 but never completed.

Perhaps Belém's most famous feature is its tower, the Belém Tower, whose image is much used by Lisbon's tourist board. The tower was built as a fortified lighthouse late in the reign of Dom Manuel l (1515–1520) to guard the entrance to the port. It stood on a little island on the right side of the Tagus, surrounded by water. Belém's other major historical building is the Mosteiro dos Jerónimos (Jerónimos Monastery), which the Belém Tower was built partly to defend. Belém's most notable modern feature is the Padrão dos Descobrimentos (Monument to the Discoveries) built for the Portuguese World Fair in 1940. In the heart of Belém is the Praça do Império: gardens centred upon a large fountain, laid out during World War II. To the west of the gardens lies the Centro Cultural de Belém. Belém is one of the most visited Lisbon districts. Here is located the Estádio do Restelo, home to Belenenses.

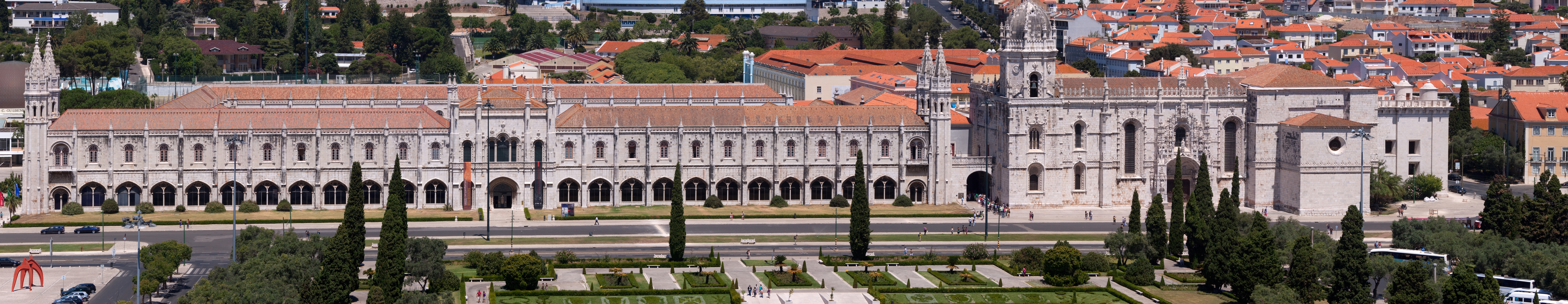
View of Jerónimos Monastery and Praça do Império (Empire Square) from the top of the Padrão dos Descobrimentos in Belém

==== Chiado ====
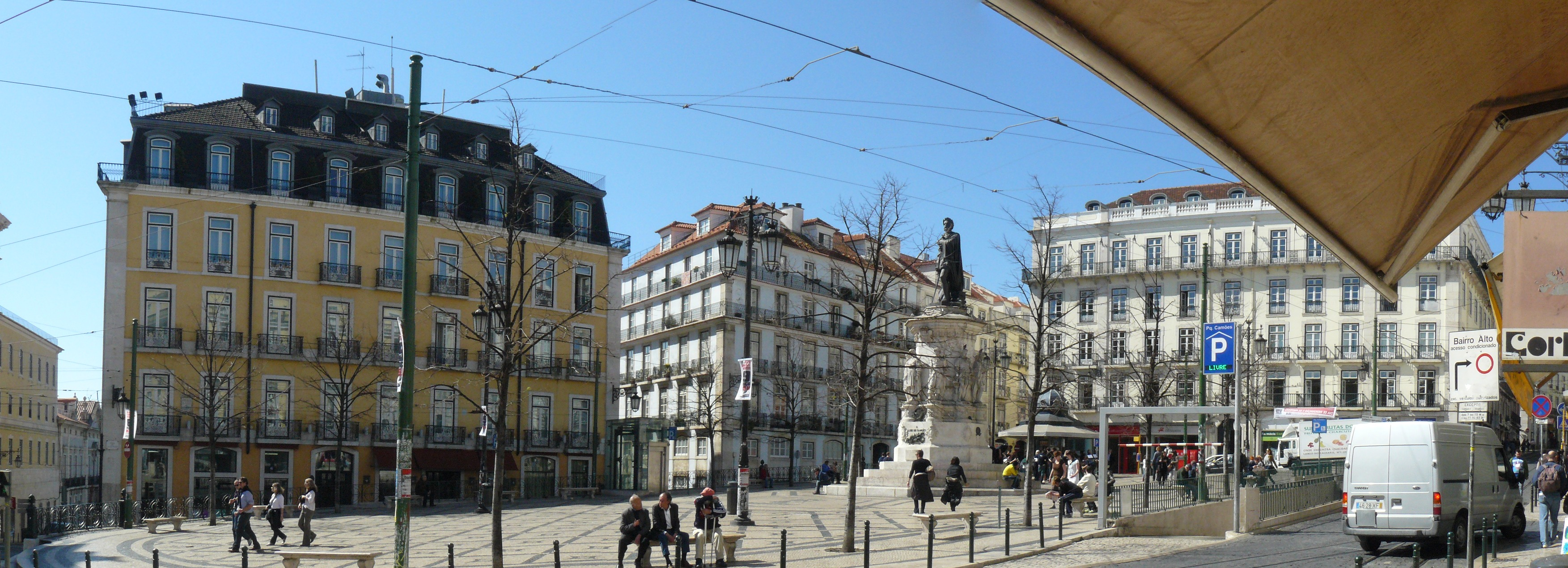
Monument to Luís de Camões, considered the greatest poet of the Portuguese language, in Chiado

The Chiado is a traditional shopping area that mixes old and modern commercial establishments, concentrated specially in the Rua do Carmo and the Rua Garrett. Locals as well as tourists visit the Chiado to buy books, clothing and pottery as well as to have a cup of coffee. The most famous café of Chiado is A Brasileira, famous for having had poet Fernando Pessoa among its customers. The Chiado is also an important cultural area, with several museums and theatres, including the opera. Several buildings of the Chiado were destroyed in a fire in 1988, an event that deeply shocked the country. Thanks to a renovation project that lasted more than 10 years, coordinated by celebrated architect Siza Vieira, the affected area has now virtually recovered.

==== Estrela ====
Estrela Basilica, the first church in the world dedicated to the cult of the Sacred Heart of Jesus

The ornate, late 18th-century Estrela Basilica is the main attraction of this district. The church with its large dome is located on a hill in what was at the time the western part of Lisbon and can be seen from great distances. The style is similar to that of the Palace-Convent of Mafra, late baroque and neoclassical. The façade has twin bell towers and includes statues of saints and some allegorical figures. São Bento Palace, the seat of the Portuguese parliament and the official residences of the Prime Minister of Portugal and the President of the Assembly of the Republic of Portugal, are in this district. Also in this district is Estrela Park, a favourite with families. There are exotic plants and trees, a duck pond, various sculptures, a children's playground, and many cultural events going on throughout the year, including outdoor cinema, markets, and music festivals.

==== Parque das Nações ====
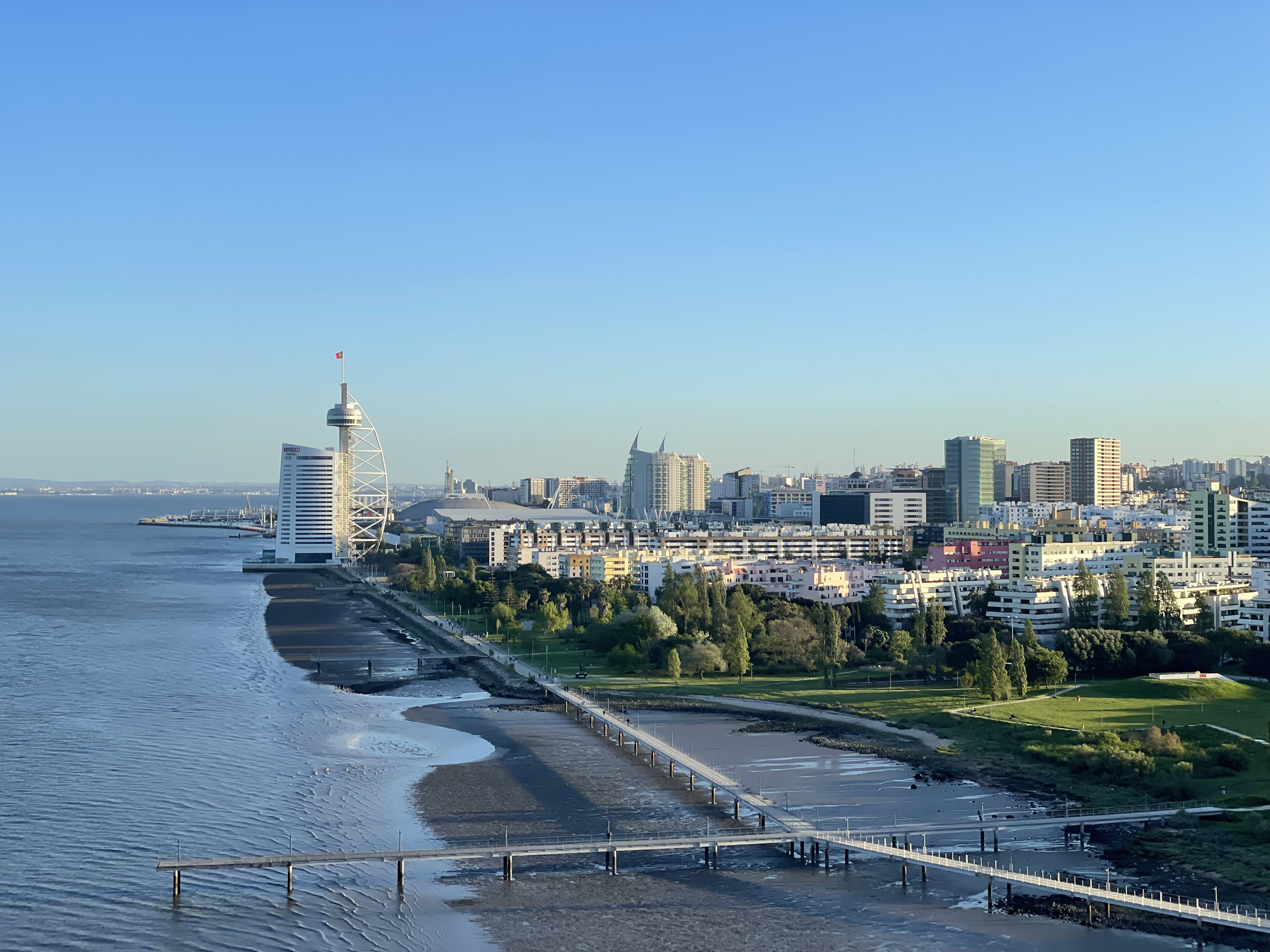
The Parque das Nações district was initially built for the Lisbon World Expo.

Parque das Nações (Park of Nations) is the newest district in Lisbon; it emerged from an urban renewal program to host the 1998 World Exhibition of Lisbon, also known as Expo'98. The area suffered massive changes giving Parque das Nações a futuristic look. A long-lasting legacy of the same, the area has become another commercial and higher-end residential area for the city.

Central in the area is the Gare do Oriente (Orient railway station), one of the main transport hubs of Lisbon for trains, buses, taxis, and the metro. Its glass and steel columns are inspired by Gothic architecture, lending the whole structure a visual fascination (especially in sunlight or when illuminated at night). It was designed by the architect Santiago Calatrava from Valencia, Spain. The Parque das Nações is across the street.

The area is pedestrian-friendly with new buildings, restaurants, gardens, the Casino Lisbon, the FIL building (International Exhibition and Fair), the Camões Theatre and the Oceanário de Lisboa (Lisbon Oceanarium), which is the second-largest in the world. The district's Altice Arena has become Lisbon's "jack-of-all-trades" performance arena. With seating for 20,000, it has staged events ranging from concerts to basketball tournaments.

== Politics ==
Lisbon City Hall, the seat of Lisbon's municipal government

Carlos Moedas (PSD) is the 78th and current Mayor of Lisbon since 18 October 2021, following the 2021 local elections. He was reelected for a second term following the 2025 local elections.

=== Local election results 1976–2025 ===
Parties are listed from left-wing to right-wing.

Summary of local elections for Lisbon city hall, 1976–2025
| Election | BE | PCP APU CDU | PS | HR | PAN | PSD | CDS | PPM | CR | IL | CH | O/I | Turnout |
|---|---|---|---|---|---|---|---|---|---|---|---|---|---|
| 1976 | | 20.7 | 35.5 | | | 15.2 | 19.0 | 0.4 | | | | 9.2 | 66.5 |
| 1979 | | 25.1 | 23.4 | | | 46.7 | | | | | | 4.8 | 75.6 |
| 1982 | | 26.7 | 27.0 | | | 41.3 | | | | | | 5.0 | 72.2 |
| 1985 | | 27.5 | 18.0 | | | 44.8 | | 5.1 | | | | 4.6 | 58.7 |
| 1989 | | 49.1 | | | | 42.1 | | | | | | 8.8 | 54.8 |
| 1993 | | 56.7 | | | | 26.3 | 7.8 | | | | | 9.2 | 53.5 |
| 1997 | | 51.9 | | | | 39.3 | | | | | | 8.8 | 48.3 |
| 2001 | 3.8 | 41.7 | | | | 42.0 | 7.6 | w.PSD | | | | 4.9 | 55.0 |
| 2005 | 7.9 | 11.4 | 26.6 | | | 42.4 | 5.9 | | | | | 5.8 | 52.7 |
| 2007 | 6.8 | 9.4 | 29.5 | 10.3 | | 15.8 | 3.7 | 0.3 | 16.6 | | | 7.6 | 37.4 |
| 2009 | 4.6 | 8.1 | 44.0 | | | 38.7 | | | | | | 4.6 | 53.4 |
| 2013 | 4.6 | 9.9 | 50.9 | | 2.3 | 22.4 | | 1.2 | | | | 8.6 | 45.1 |
| 2017 | 7.1 | 9.6 | 42.0 | | 3.0 | 11.2 | 20.6 | | | | | 6.5 | 51.2 |
| 2021 | 6.2 | 10.5 | 33.3 | | 2.7 | 34.3 | | | | 4.2 | 4.4 | 4.4 | 51.0 |
| 2025 | w.PS | 10.1 | 34.0 | | | 41.7 | | 0.3 | | w.PSD | 10.1 | 3.8 | 57.2 |
Source: Marktest

== Culture ==
The city of Lisbon is rich in architecture; Romanesque, Gothic, Manueline, Baroque, Modern and Postmodern constructions can be found all over Lisbon. The city is also crossed by historical boulevards and monuments along the main thoroughfares, particularly in the upper districts; notable among these are the Avenida da Liberdade (Avenue of Liberty), Avenida Fontes Pereira de Melo, Avenida Almirante Reis and Avenida da República (Avenue of the Republic).

Lisbon is home to numerous prominent museums and art collections, from all around the world. The National Museum of Ancient Art, which has one of the largest art collections in the world, and the National Coach Museum, which has the world's largest collection of royal coaches and carriages, are the two most visited museums in the city. Other notable national museums include the National Museum of Archaeology, the Museum of Lisbon, the National Azulejo Museum, the National Museum of Contemporary Art, and the National Museum of Natural History & Science.

Prominent private museums and galleries include the Gulbenkian Museum (run by the Calouste Gulbenkian Foundation, one of the wealthiest foundations in the world), which houses one of the largest private collections of antiquities and art in the world, the Contemporary Art Museum - Centro Cultural de Belém, the Museum of Art, Architecture and Technology, and the Museum of the Orient. Other popular museums include the Electricity Museum, the Ephemeral Museum, the Museu da Água, and the Museu Benfica, among many others.

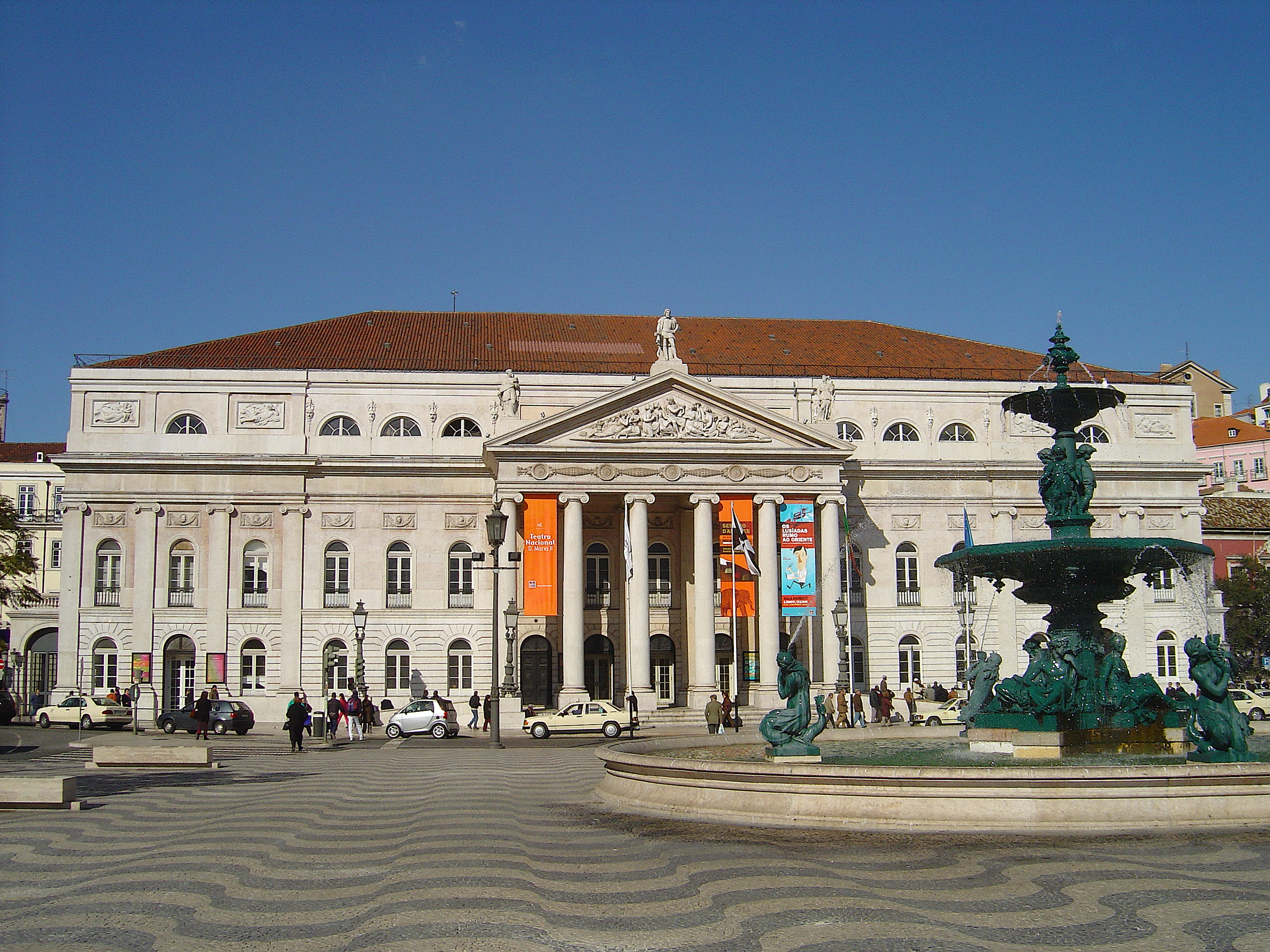
Rossio Square, with Queen Maria II National Theatre in the background

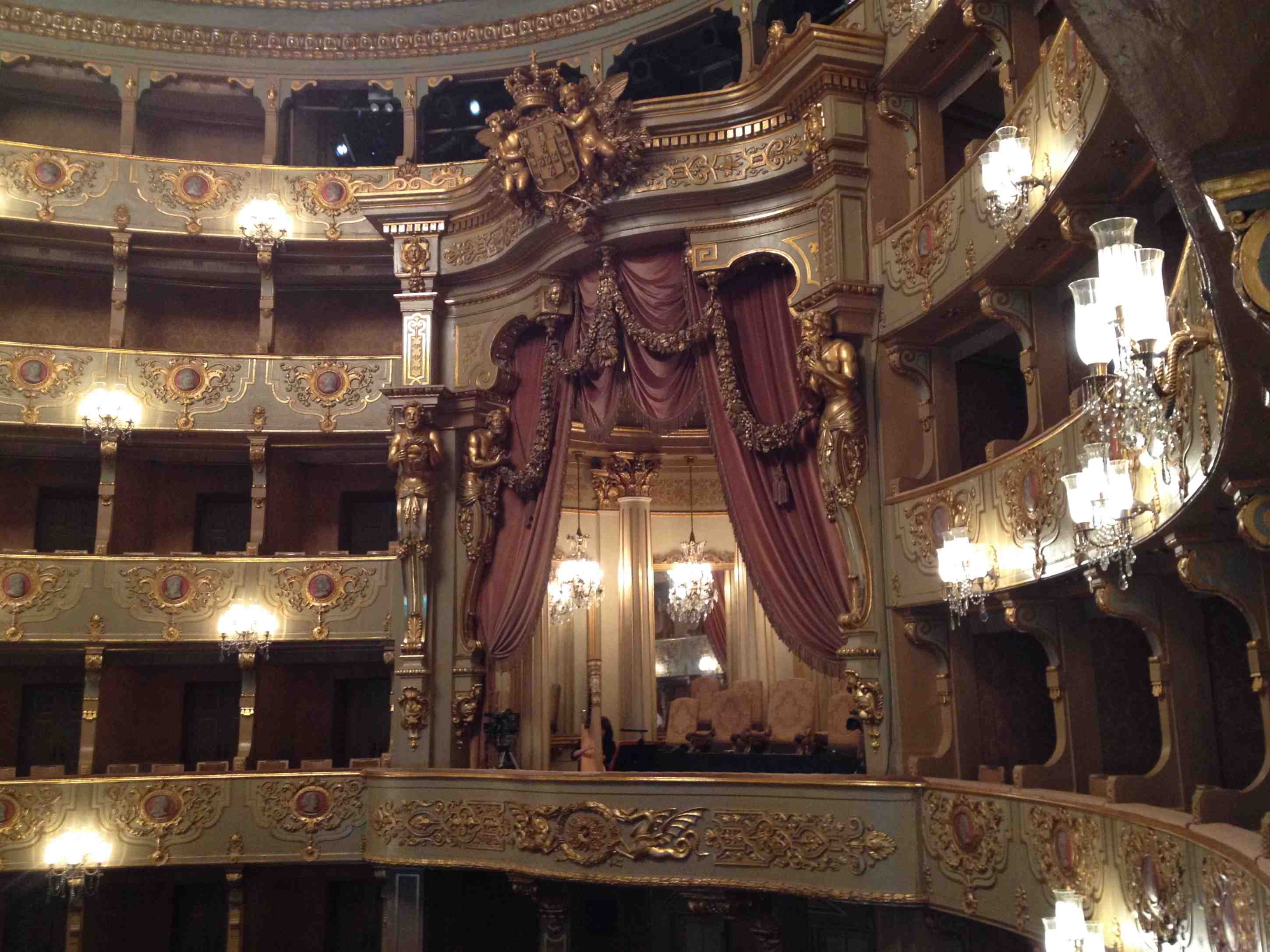
Teatro Nacional de São Carlos' "Royal box"

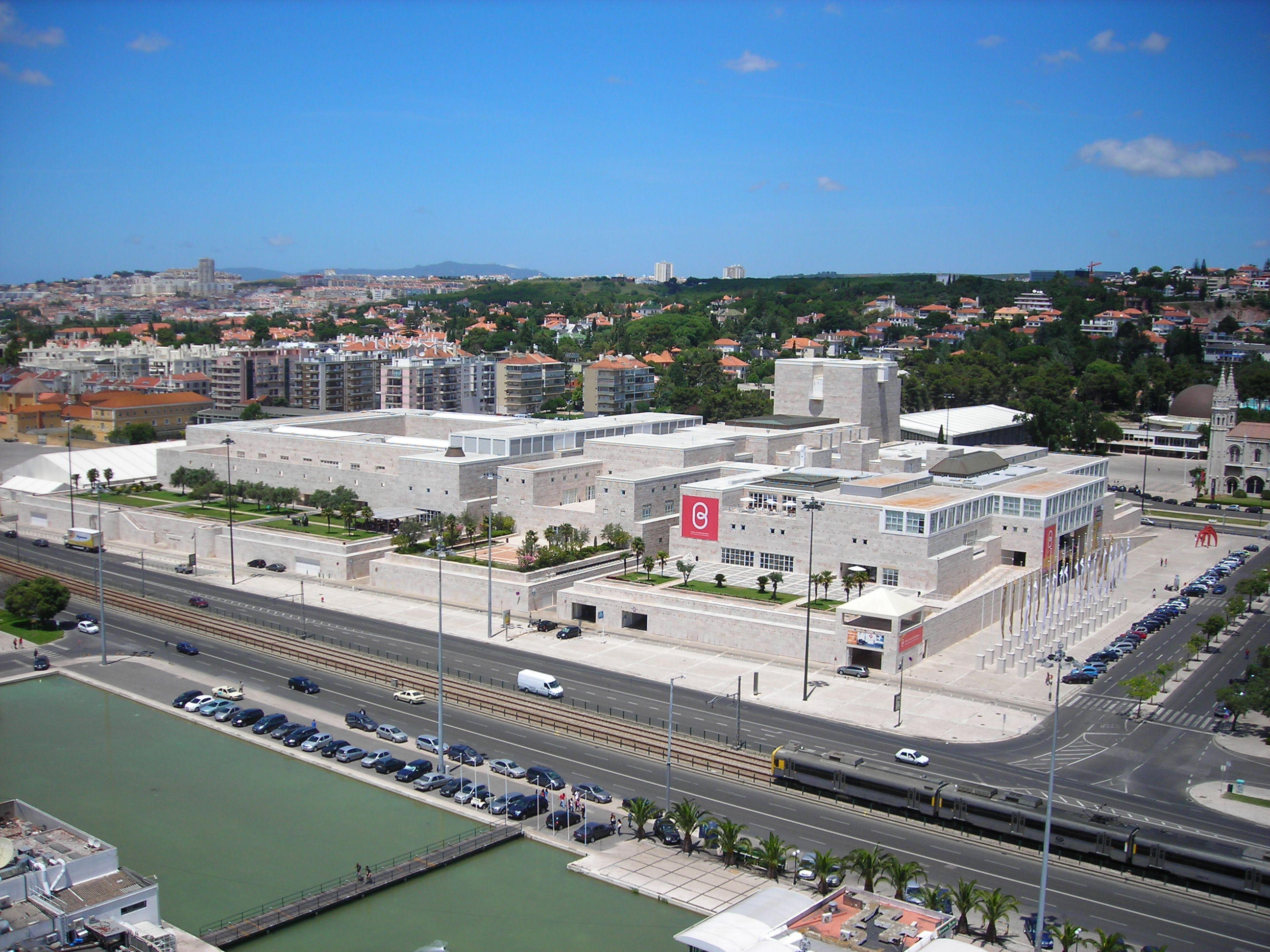
Centro Cultural de Belém building in Belém

Lisbon's Opera House, the Teatro Nacional de São Carlos, hosts a relatively active cultural agenda, mainly in autumn and winter. Other important theatres and musical houses are the Centro Cultural de Belém, the Teatro Nacional D. Maria II, the Gulbenkian Foundation, and the Teatro Camões.

The monument to Christ the King (Cristo-Rei) stands on the southern bank of the Tagus River, in Almada. With open arms, overlooking the whole city, it resembles the Corcovado monument in Rio de Janeiro, and was built after World War II, as a memorial of thanksgiving for Portugal's being spared the horrors and destruction of the war.

Lisbon's holiday in honour of the city's saint, Anthony of Lisbon (Portuguese: Santo António), is 13 June. Saint Anthony, also known as Saint Anthony of Padua, was a wealthy Portuguese bohemian who was canonised and made Doctor of the Church after a life preaching to the poor. Although Lisbon's patron saint is Saint Vincent of Saragossa, whose remains are housed in the Sé Cathedral, there are no festivities associated with this saint.

Edward VII Park, the second-largest park in the city following the Monsanto Forest Park, extends down the main avenue (Avenida da Liberdade), with many flowering plants and green spaces, and includes the permanent collection of subtropical and tropical plants in the winter garden (Portuguese: Estufa Fria). Originally named Parque da Liberdade, it was renamed in honour of Edward VII who visited Lisbon in 1903.

Lisbon hosts many annual festivals, including the Lisbon Gay & Lesbian Film Festival, the Lisboarte, the DocLisboa – Lisbon International Documentary Film Festival, the Festival Internacional de Máscaras e Comediantes, the Lisboa Mágica – Street Magic World Festival, the Monstra – Animated Film Festival, the Lisbon Book Fair, the Peixe em Lisboa – Lisbon Fish and Flavours, among others.

Lisbon has two sites listed by UNESCO as a World Heritage Site: Belém Tower and Jerónimos Monastery. Furthermore, in 1994, Lisbon was the European Capital of Culture and, in 1998, organised the Expo '98 (1998 Lisbon World Exposition).

Lisbon is also home to the Lisbon Architecture Triennial, the Moda Lisboa (Fashion Lisbon), ExperimentaDesign – Biennial of Design, and LuzBoa – Biennial of Light.

Lisbon hosts many fine examples of Portuguese azulejo tile art, a use of ceramic tile as an architectural finish for both building interiors and exteriors dating from the 15th century. This art form is celebrated in Lisbon's National Museum of the Azulejo and as a station feature in the Lisbon metro. In addition, the mosaic Portuguese pavement (Calçada Portuguesa) was born in Lisbon, in the mid-1800s. The art has since spread to the rest of the Portuguese Speaking world. The city remains one of the most expansive examples of the technique, nearly all walkways and even many streets being created and maintained in this style.

In May 2018, the city hosted the 63rd edition of the Eurovision Song Contest, after the victory of Salvador Sobral with the song "Amar pelos dois" in Kyiv on 13 May 2017.

World Youth Day 2023 was hosted in August of that year in Lisbon, attracting hundreds of thousands of young Catholics from over 140 countries.

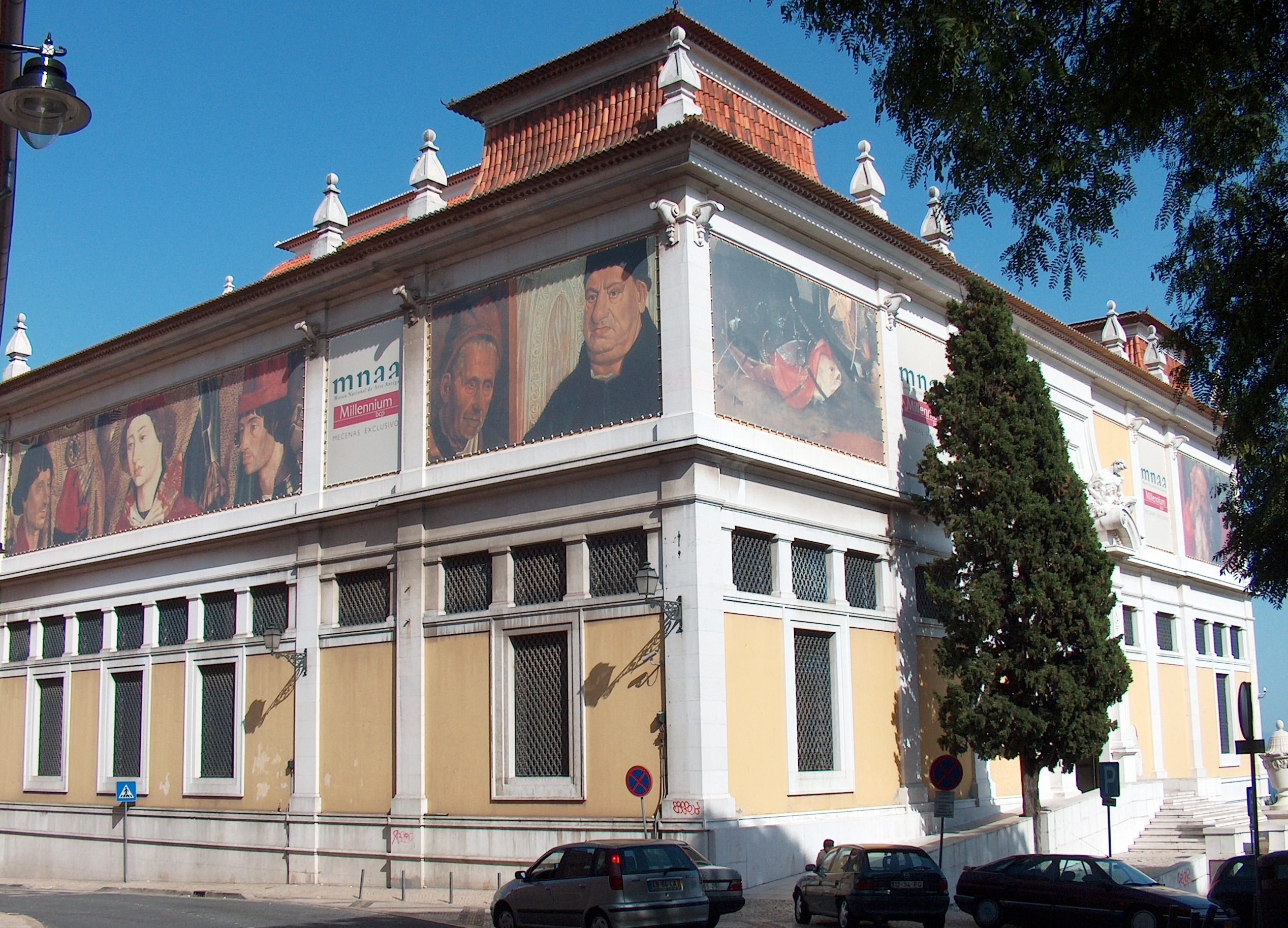
The National Museum of Ancient Art has one of the largest art collections in the world.

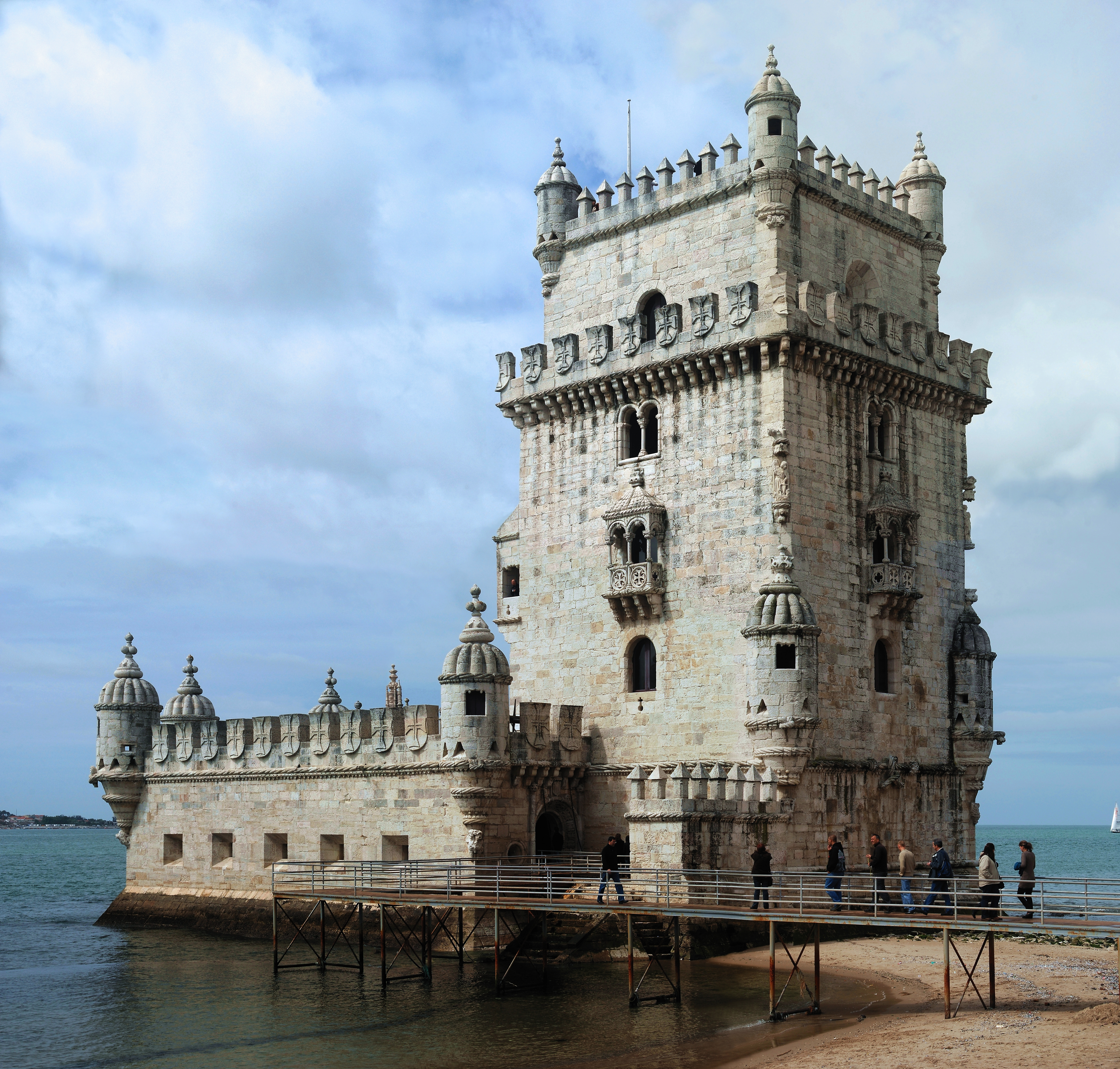
The Belém Tower, one of the most famous and visited landmarks in Lisbon and throughout Portugal

The Calouste Gulbenkian Foundation is one of the wealthiest foundations in the world and houses one of the largest private collections of antiquaries and art in the world, within the Gulbenkian Museum.

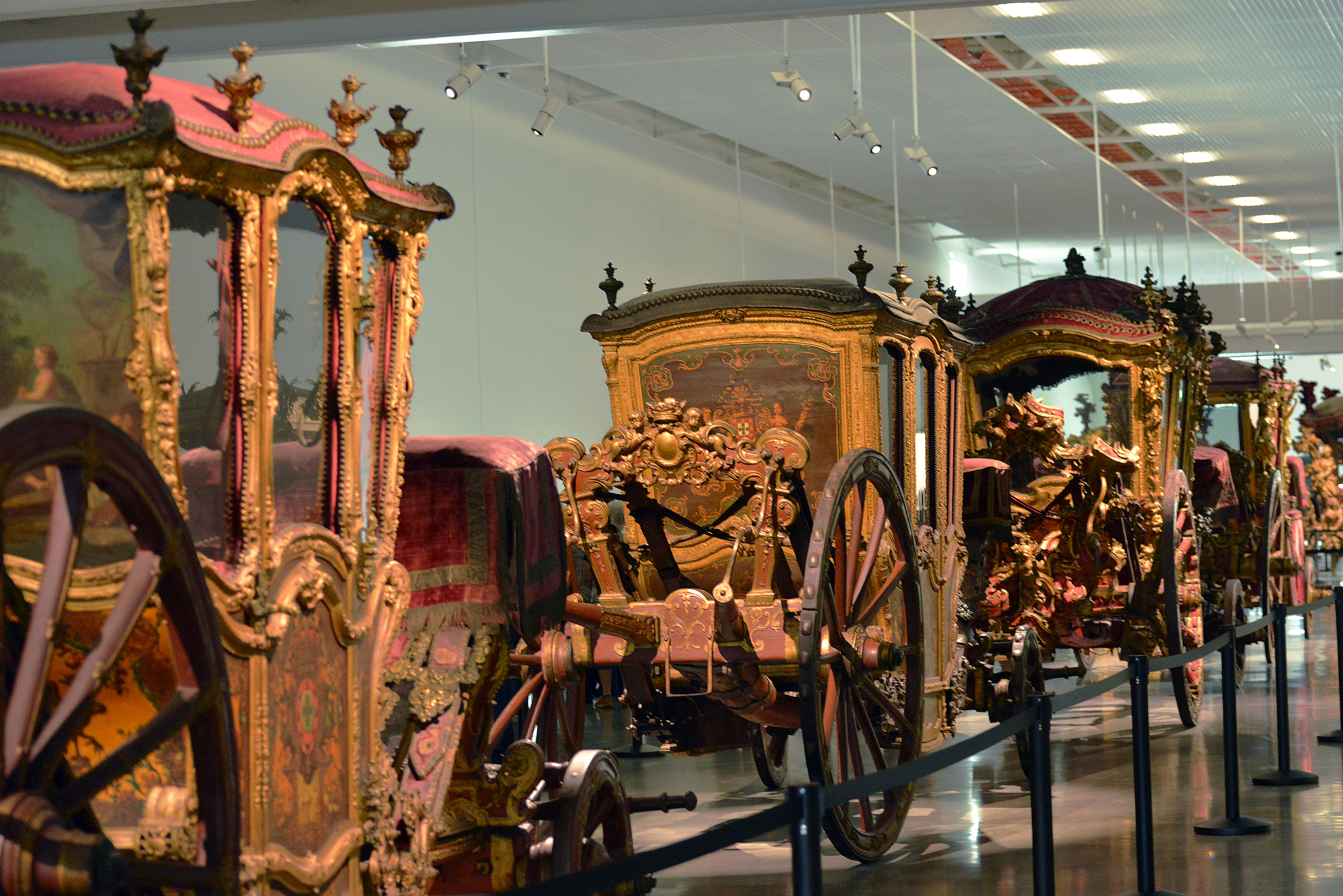
The National Coach Museum has the largest collection of royal carriages in the world and is one of Lisbon's most visited institutions.

The modern Museum of Art, Architecture and Technology (MAAT).

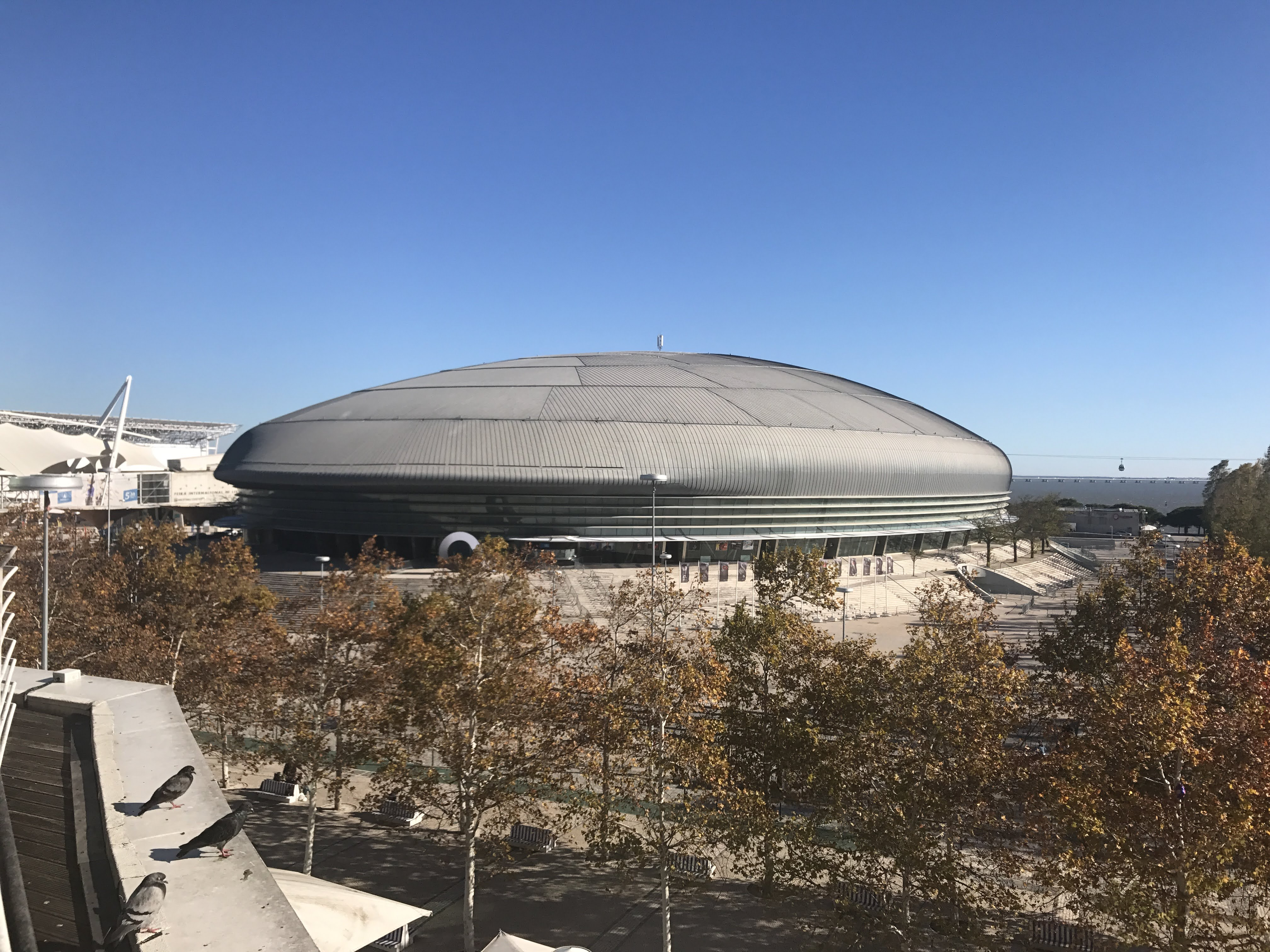
MEO Arena is one of the largest indoor arenas in Europe.

== Demographics ==
Historical population

| Year | Pop. | ±% |
|---|---|---|
| 43 | 30,000 | — |
| 900 | 100,000 | +233.3% |
| 1552 | 200,000 | +100.0% |
| 1598 | 150,000 | −25.0% |
| 1720 | 185,000 | +23.3% |
| 1755 | 180,000 | −2.7% |
| 1756 | 165,000 | −8.3% |
| 1801 | 203,999 | +23.6% |
| 1806 | 250,000 | +22.5% |
| 1849 | 174,668 | −30.1% |
| 1864 | 190,311 | +9.0% |
| 1878 | 240,740 | +26.5% |
| 1890 | 300,964 | +25.0% |
| 1901 | 351,210 | +16.7% |

| Year | Pop. | ±% |
|---|---|---|
| 1911 | 431,738 | +22.9% |
| 1920 | 484,664 | +12.3% |
| 1930 | 591,939 | +22.1% |
| 1940 | 694,389 | +17.3% |
| 1950 | 783,226 | +12.8% |
| 1960 | 802,230 | +2.4% |
| 1971 | 769,044 | −4.1% |
| 1981 | 807,937 | +5.1% |
| 1991 | 663,394 | −17.9% |
| 2001 | 564,657 | −14.9% |
| 2011 | 552,700 | −2.1% |
| 2021 | 545,796 | −1.2% |
| 2024 | 665,141 | +21.9% |
| 2025 | 658,236 | −1.0% |

Source: INE

The historical population of the city was about 35,000 in 1300. This number went up to 60,000 in 1400, and raised to 70,000 by 1500. Between 1528 and 1590 the population went from 70,000 to 120,000. The population was about 150,000 in 1600, and almost 200,000 in 1700.

Lisbon has 658,236 inhabitants within the administrative centre on the area of only 100.05 km^{2} (38.63 sq mi). The population density of the city itself is 5,668.5/km^{2} (14,681/sq mi).

The Lisbon metropolitan area incorporates two NUTS III (European statistical subdivisions): Grande Lisboa (Greater Lisbon), along the northern bank of the Tagus River, and Península de Setúbal (Setúbal Peninsula), along the southern bank. These two subdivisions make for the Região de Lisboa (Lisbon Region).

Lisbon population pyramid in 2021

Administratively defined cities that exist in the vicinity of the capital are in fact part of the metropolitan perimeter of Lisbon. The urban area has, according to Government data, a population of approximately 3.35 million inhabitants and is the eleventh largest urban area in the European Union. Other sources also show similar figures: according to the Organisation for Economic Co-operation and Development the area had 2,797,612 inhabitants; according to the Department of Economic and Social Affairs of the United Nations 2,890,000; according to the European Statistical Office Eurostat 2,839,908 and according to the Brookings Institution 2,968,600.

Lisbon's population has steadily dropped over the years due to people searching better accommodations for lower prices elsewhere in Greater Lisbon. A reverse trend has been observed in recent years, with the population increasing to more the 658,000 people in 2025, an all-time high since 1991 census and a 20.6% increase since the 2021 census.

In addition, a plurality of the houses in the city centre have become tourist facilities, exacerbating the low supply of housing in Lisbon.

=== Religion ===
Religion in the municipality of Lisbon (Census 2021)
1. Catholicism (65.6%)
2. Orthodoxy (0.68%)
3. Protestantism (2.44%)
4. Jehovah's Witnesses (0.61%)
5. Other Christian (1.27%)
6. Buddhism (0.54%)
7. Hinduism (1.07%)
8. Judaism (0.12%)
9. Islam (1.63%)
10. Other religion (0.50%)
11. No religion (25.6%)

The largest religion is, according to the 2021 Portuguese Census, Roman Catholicism. The proportion of Catholics in Lisbon city proper (about 66%) is significantly higher than in the city's metropolitan area (55%). This may be due to the fact that Lisbon city's age structure is older than the one found in the surrounding areas and, in general, younger generations tend to be less religious.

=== Immigration ===
In 2019, about 17.48% of the population residing within the city's boundaries held a foreign nationality, a share that stood at 8.87% in 2014. In general, the increase in Lisbon's population is essentially attributable to the influx of people coming from abroad, who have more than tripled since 2017. About 5.89% of Lisbon's population was constituted by Brazilians as of 2023, not including those also holding Portuguese nationality.

Largest groups of foreign residents in 2023
| Nationality | Population | Notes |
| Brazil | 33,407 | |
| China | 9,905 | |
| Italy | 9,391 | 2022 data |
| France | 9,033 | 2022 data |
| Nepal | 8,875 | 2022 data |
| Bangladesh | 8,486 | 2022 data |
| Angola | 7,594 | |

== Economy ==
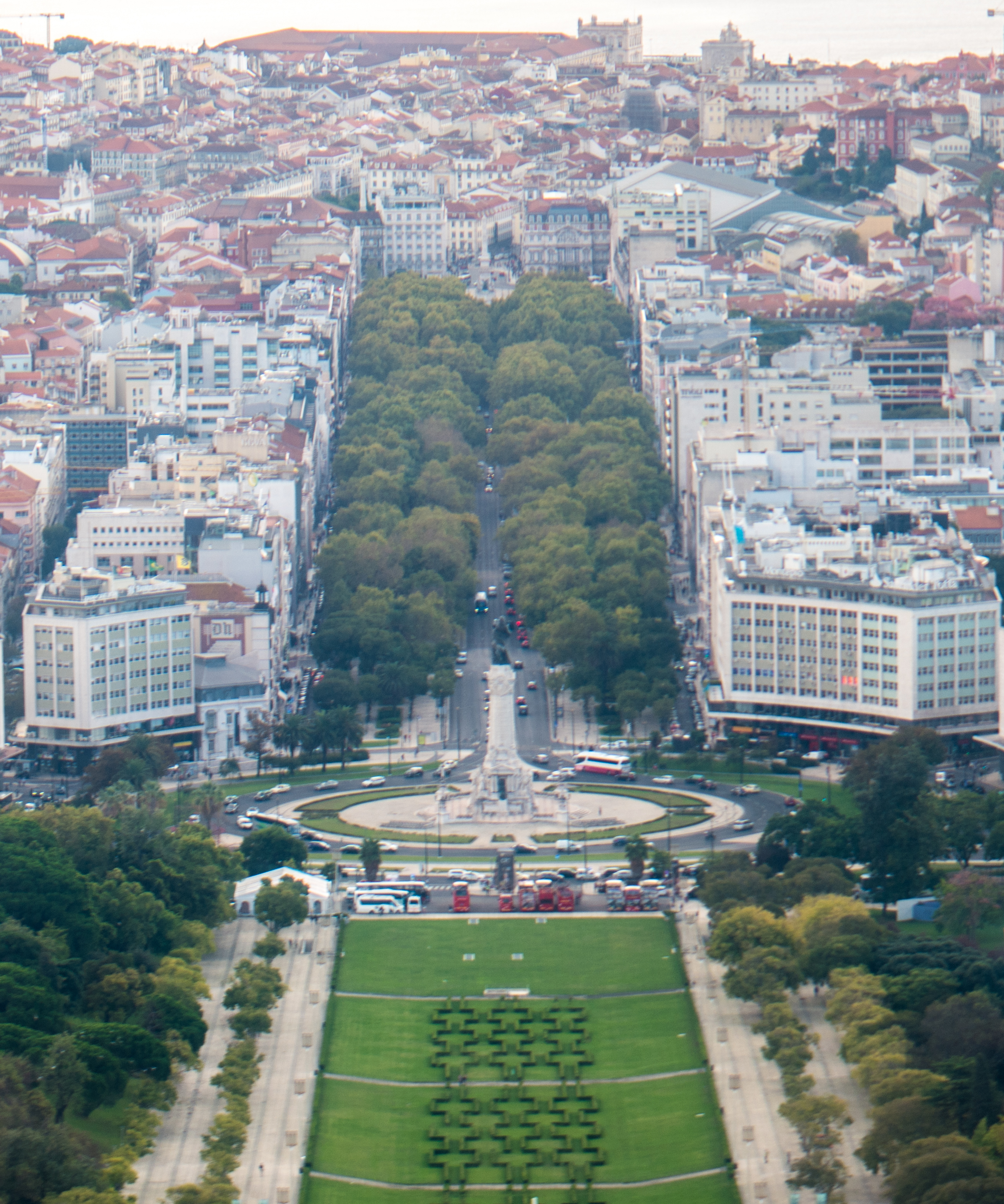
Avenida da Liberdade is one of the most expensive shopping streets in Europe and famous as a popular destination for luxury goods shopping.

The Lisbon region is the wealthiest region in Portugal, with a GDP per capita of more than €42,000, and it is well above the European Union's GDP per capita average – it produces more than 31% of Portuguese GDP by 2024.

The Lisbon region is rapidly growing, with GDP (PPP) per capita calculated for each year as follows: €22,745 (2004) – €23,816 (2005) – €25,200 (2006) – €26,100 (2007). The Lisbon metropolitan area had a GDP amounting to US$110.4 billion, and US$32,434 per capita.

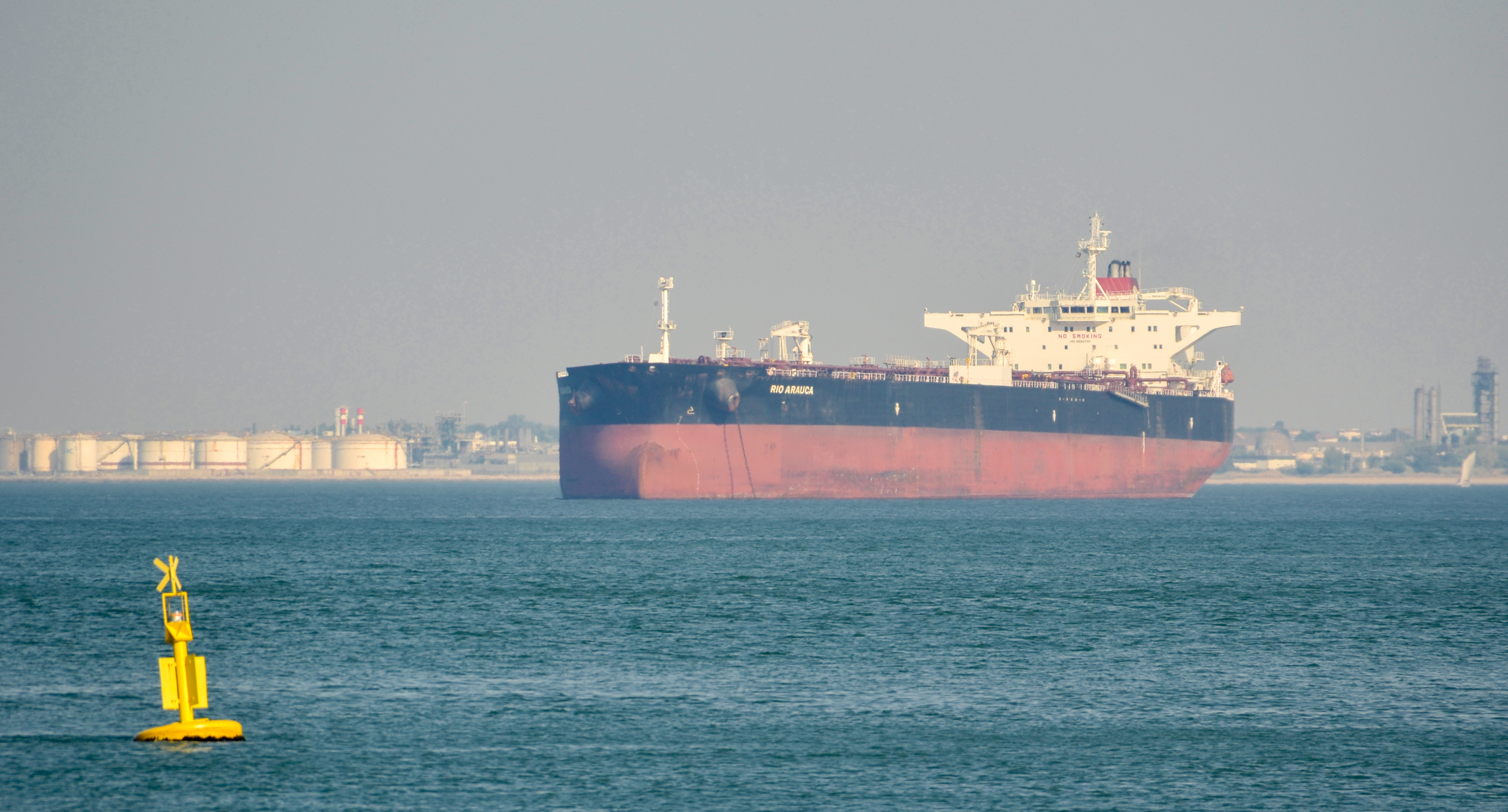
The oil tanker Rio Arauca at the oil terminal in Lisboa to unload crude oil

Lisbon's economy is based primarily on the tertiary sector. Most of the headquarters of multinationals operating in Portugal are concentrated in the Grande Lisboa Subregion, especially in the Oeiras municipality. The Lisbon metropolitan area is heavily industrialised, especially the south bank of the Tagus river (Rio Tejo). The lisbonite industry has very large sectors in oil, as refineries are found just across the Tagus, textile mills, shipyards and fishing.

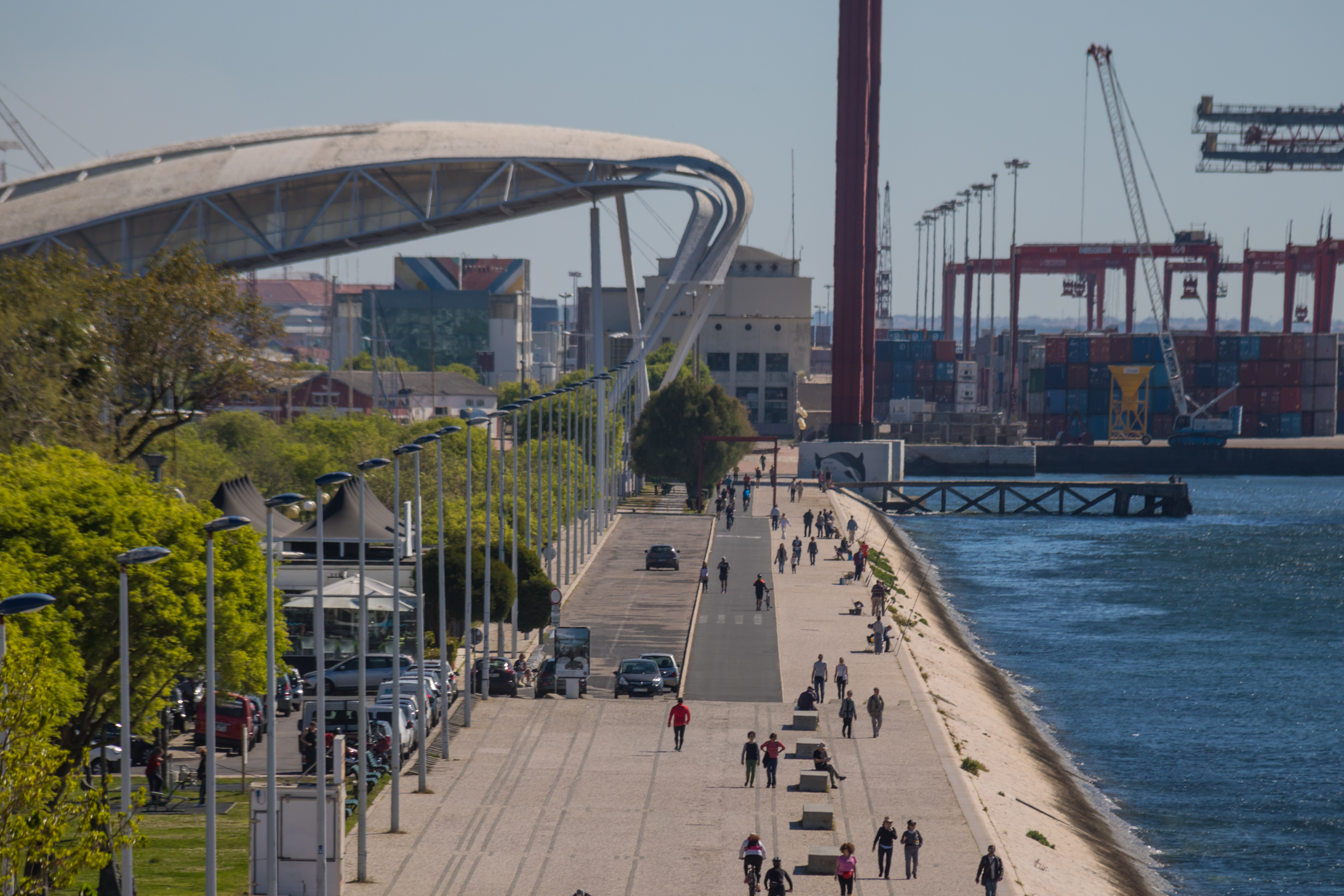
The Port of Lisbon is one of the busiest ports in Europe.

The country's chief seaport is in Lisbon and its heavily populated surroundings are also developing as an important financial centre and a dynamic technological hub. Automobile manufacturers have erected factories in the suburbs, like AutoEuropa.

Lisbon has the largest and most developed mass media sector of Portugal and is home to several related companies ranging from leading television networks and radio stations to major newspapers. Based in Lisbon, Euronext Lisbon is a stock exchange which is part of the pan-European Euronext system of stock exchanges and market infrastructure.

Before Portugal's sovereign debt crisis and an EU-IMF rescue plan, for the decade of 2010 Lisbon was expecting to receive many state-funded investments, including building a new airport, a new bridge, an expansion of the Lisbon Metro 30 km (19 mi) underground, the construction of a mega-hospital (or central hospital), the creation of two lines of a TGV to join Madrid, Porto, Vigo and the rest of Europe, the restoration of the main part of the town (between the Marquês de Pombal roundabout and Terreiro do Paço), the creation of a large number of bike lanes, as well as modernisation and renovation of various facilities.

The sovereign debt crisis exacerbated poor labour conditions and low purchasing power. Although the city modernised its infrastructure and experienced significant tourism growth and income, this reality was not proportionally reflected in the average living conditions. Prices generally increased, but wages did not follow this trend. Labour conditions remain far below the standards of the rest of the European Union (EU).

Therefore, Lisbon is still the European capital with some of the lowest wages and purchasing power within the EU. Energy, electricity, gas, and fuel, as well as supermarkets and housing, are among the most expensive, even compared to the richest countries in Europe. The gap between the highest and lowest wages is the largest within the eurozone. The minimum wage can be as low as 6-7 euros per hour. Due to these reasons, Lisbon has a high level of youth emigration, mostly to other European countries such as France, the UK, Luxembourg, Switzerland, and Belgium.

Lisbon was the 7th most "livable city" in the world in 2021 according to lifestyle magazine Monocle.

Tourism is also a significant industry. The city is the ninth-most-visited city in Southern Europe, after Istanbul, Rome, Barcelona, Milan, Athens, Venice, Madrid and Florence with 3,639,900 tourists in 2019. In 2022 there were about 6 tourists for every resident. The city is popular for both leisure and business tourism. About 7.7 million tourists visited Lisbon region in 2022 alone, with 71.1% of them being international tourists. It is estimated that tourist receipts will stand at €17.4 billion in 2023.

== Transport ==
=== Metro ===
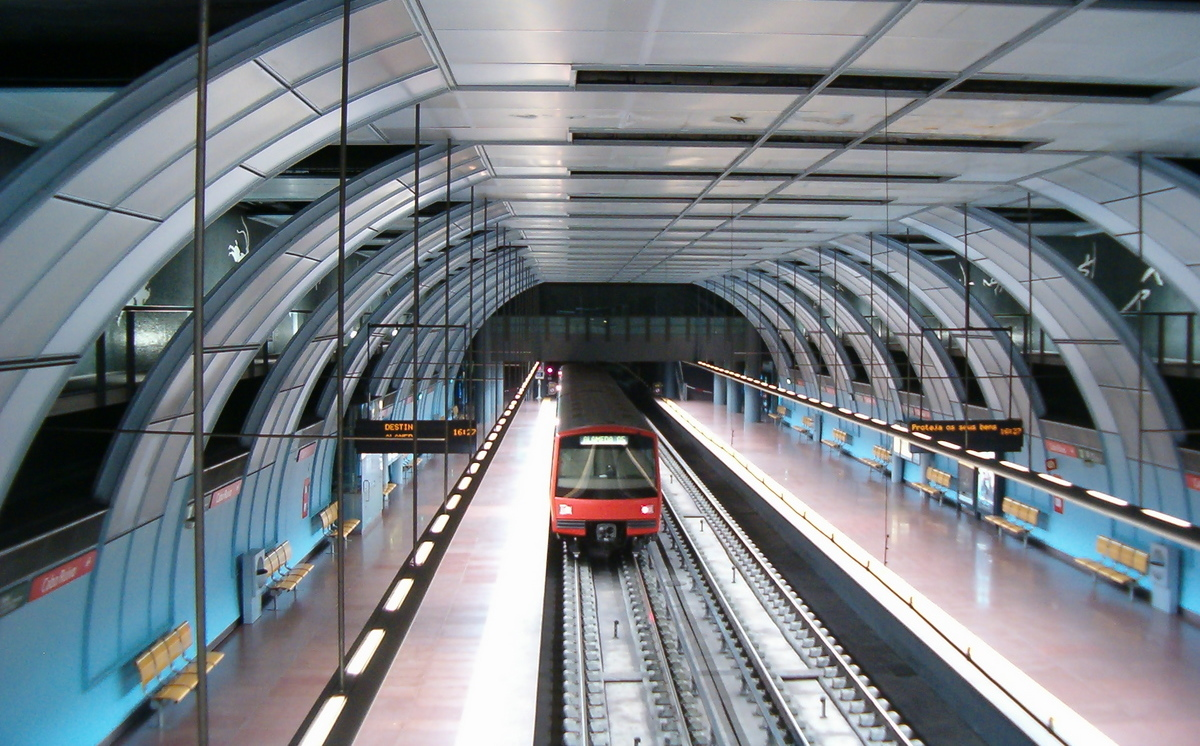
The Lisbon Metro is Portugal's oldest and largest subway system.

The Lisbon Metro connects the city centre with the upper and eastern districts, and also reaches some suburbs that are part of the Lisbon metropolitan area, such as Amadora and Loures. It is the fastest way to get around the city and it provides a good number of interchanging stations with other types of transportation. From the Lisbon Airport station to the city centre it may take roughly 25 mins. In 2019, the Lisbon Metro served about 173 million passengers (and 475.000 daily). As of 2018, the Lisbon Metro comprises four lines, identified by individual colours (blue, yellow, green and red) and 56 stations, with a total length of 44.2 kilometres (27.5 mi). Several expansion projects have been proposed, the most recent being the transformation of the Green Line into a circular line and the creation of two more stations (Santos and Estrela).

=== Trams ===
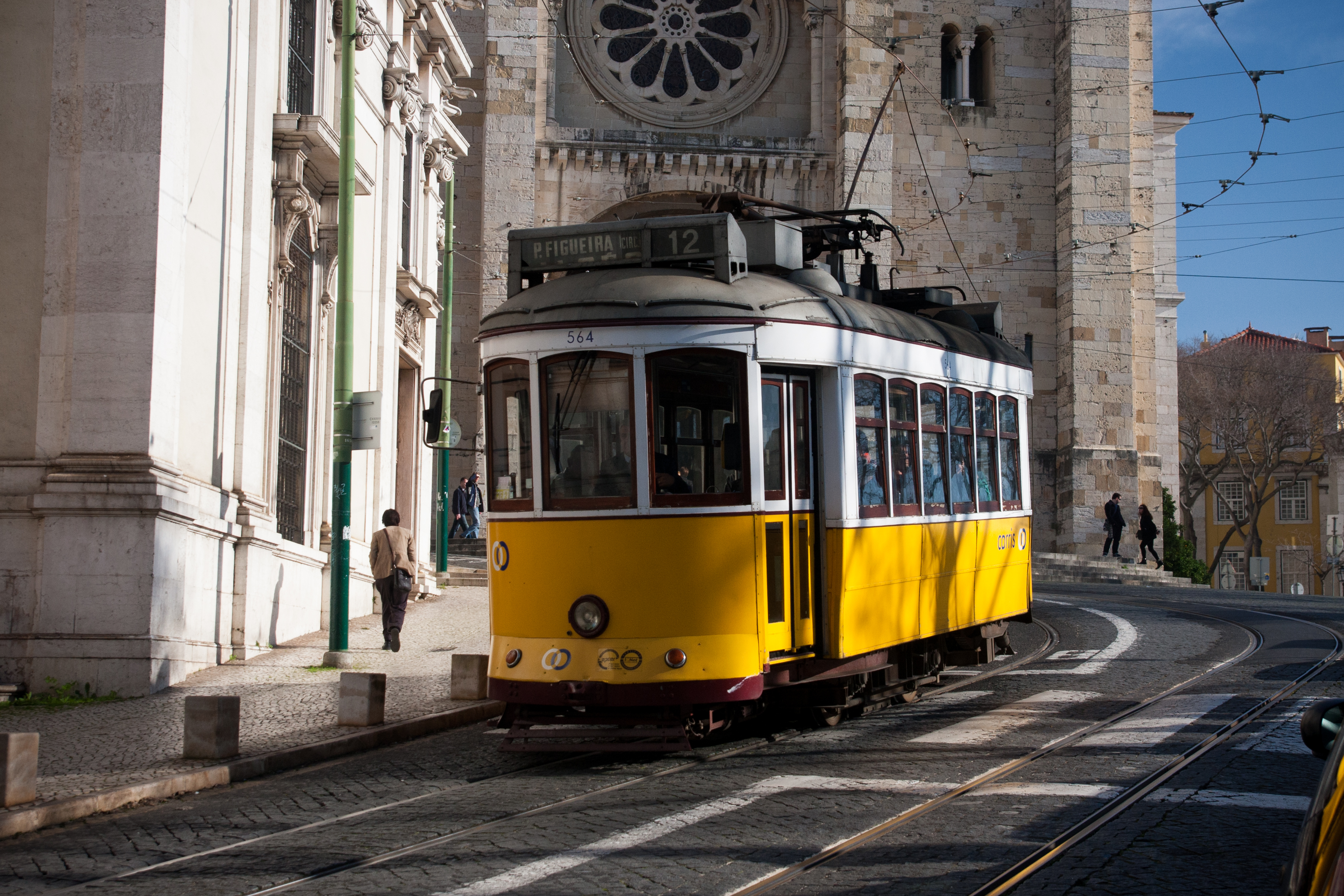
A Lisbon tram by Lisbon Cathedral and Santo António Church

The tram is a traditional form of public transport in Lisbon. Introduced in 1901, electric trams were originally imported from the US, and thus called the americanos (Portuguese for "American"). Today these trams are called elétricos (literally meaning electric ones).

Other than on the modern Line 15, the Lisbon tramway system still employs small (four-wheel) vehicles of a design dating from the early twentieth century. These distinctive yellow trams are one of the tourist icons of modern Lisbon, and their size is well suited to the steep hills and narrow streets of the central city.

The earliest trams can still be seen in the Museu da Carris (the Lisbon Public Transport Museum).

The line has now a total length of 31 kilometres (19 mi) operating on 6 lines, down from a maximum of 76 kilometres (47 mi) for 27 lines. The slow decline of the network began with the construction of the Lisbon Metro and the expansion of the bus system. Starting in 2017 the system has been expanded and new vehicles are being progressively added, aiming at expanding significantly the current tramway system. There are currently 64 trams in operation in Lisbon and, during 2023–2026, 35 more will be added (of which 10 will be "Historical models").

=== Trains ===
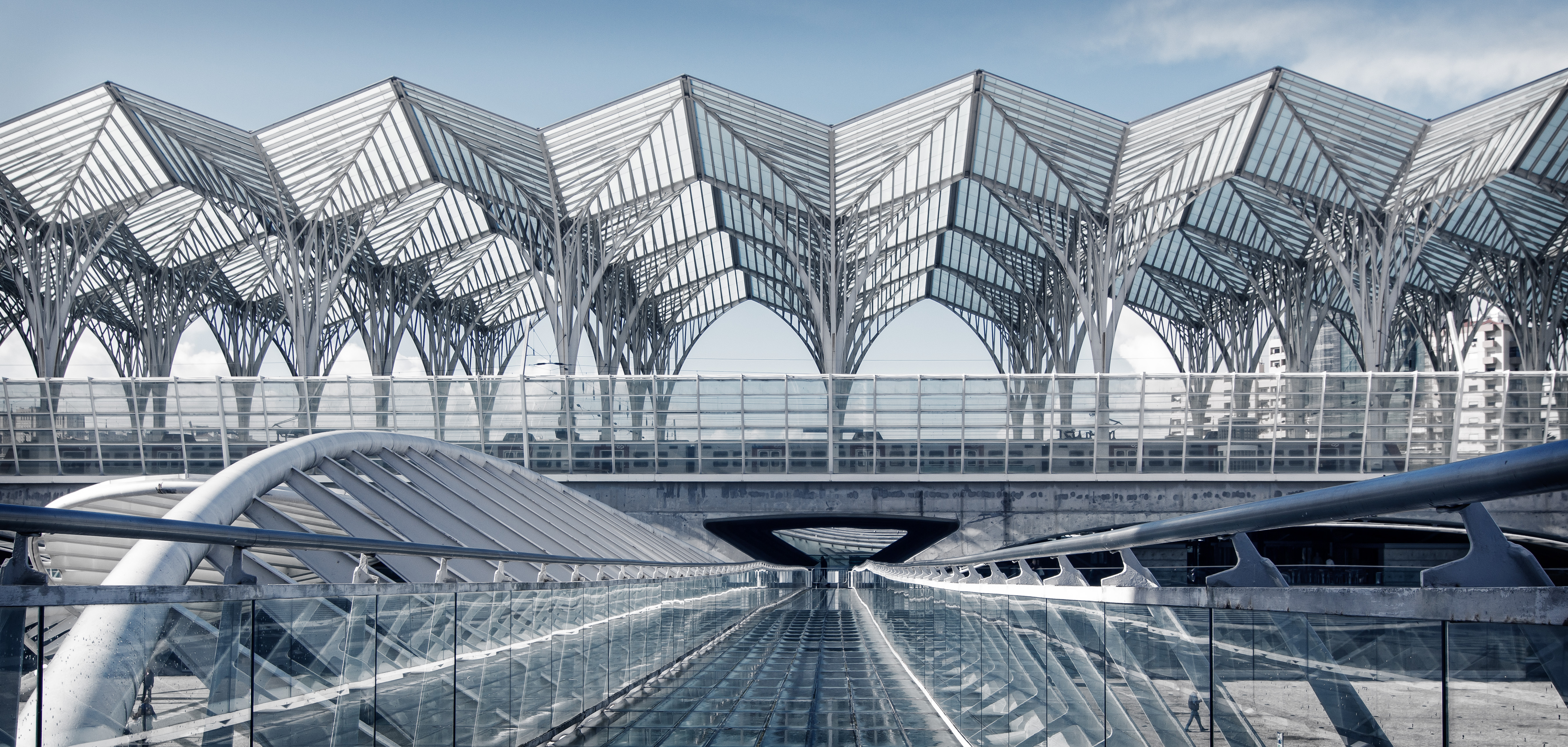
Gare do Oriente train station, designed by Santiago Calatrava

There are four commuter train lines departing from Lisbon: the Sintra, Azambuja, Cascais and Sado lines (operated by CP – Comboios de Portugal), as well as a fifth line to Setúbal (operated by Fertagus), which crosses the Tagus river via the 25 de Abril Bridge. The major railway stations are Santa Apolónia, Rossio, Gare do Oriente, Entrecampos, and Cais do Sodré.

=== Buses ===
The local bus service within Lisbon is operated by Carris. Carris' fleet includes 741 buses and, in the period 2023–2026, another 342 buses will be added so as to increase the public transportation system reach. The bus network has a length of 748 kilometres (465 mi) comprising 99 bus routes. Major investments have been made in recent years: for instance, in 2017 there were 600 buses operating on 674 kilometres (419 mi) and 75 routes: 141 buses, 74 kilometres (46 mi) and 24 bus routes were added in 2018–2022.

Outside Lisbon, there are two main commuter bus services connecting the cities outside Lisbon amongst them and to Lisbon: Carris Metropolitana, a brand operated by 4 companies, all operating inside the Lisbon Metropolitan Area, and Barraqueiro Transportes (with 4 brands operating outside the Metropolitan Area with services to Lisbon), which operate from different terminals in the city.

=== Bridges ===
The city is connected to the far side of the Tagus by two important bridges:

- The 25 de Abril Bridge, inaugurated (as Ponte Salazar) on 6 August 1966, and later renamed after the date of the Carnation Revolution, was the longest suspension bridge in Europe.
- The Vasco da Gama Bridge, opened on 29 March 1998 is, at 17.2 km (10.7 mi), the longest bridge in Europe.

The foundations for a third bridge across the Tagus have already been laid, but the overall project has been postponed due to economic crisis that affected Portugal, and other bureaucratic and political reasons.

The 25 de Abril Bridge crosses the Tagus River from Alcântara to Almada

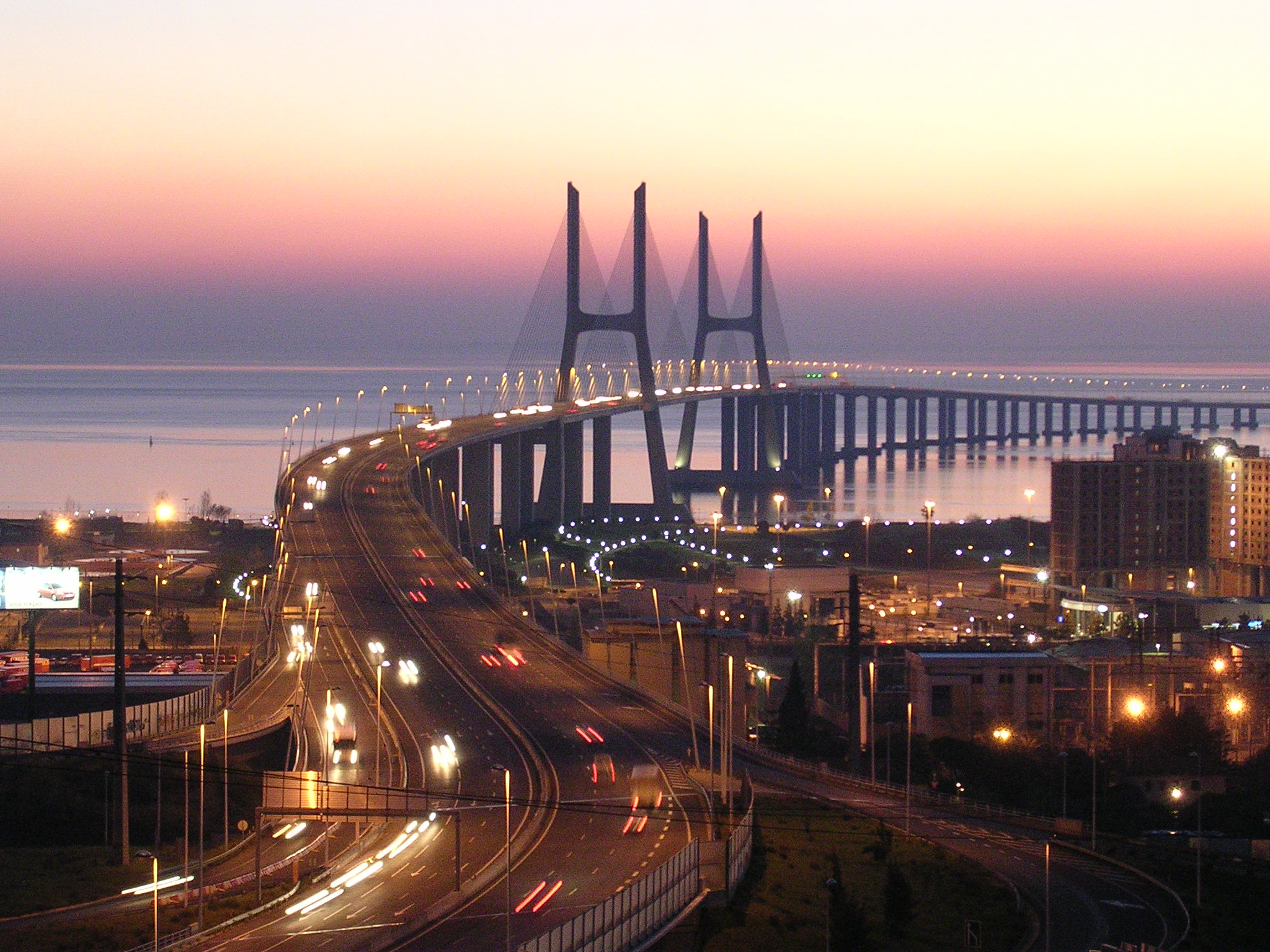
The Vasco da Gama Bridge crosses the Tagus from Parque das Nações to Montijo

=== Ferries ===
Another way of crossing the river is by taking the ferry. The operator Transtejo & Soflusa, runs to different locations from within the city: Cacilhas, Seixal, Montijo, Porto Brandão and Trafaria under the brand Transtejo and to Barreiro under the brand Soflusa. Ferry stations in Lisbon include Belém Station, Terreiro do Paço River Station and Cais do Sodré River Station.

=== Air travel ===
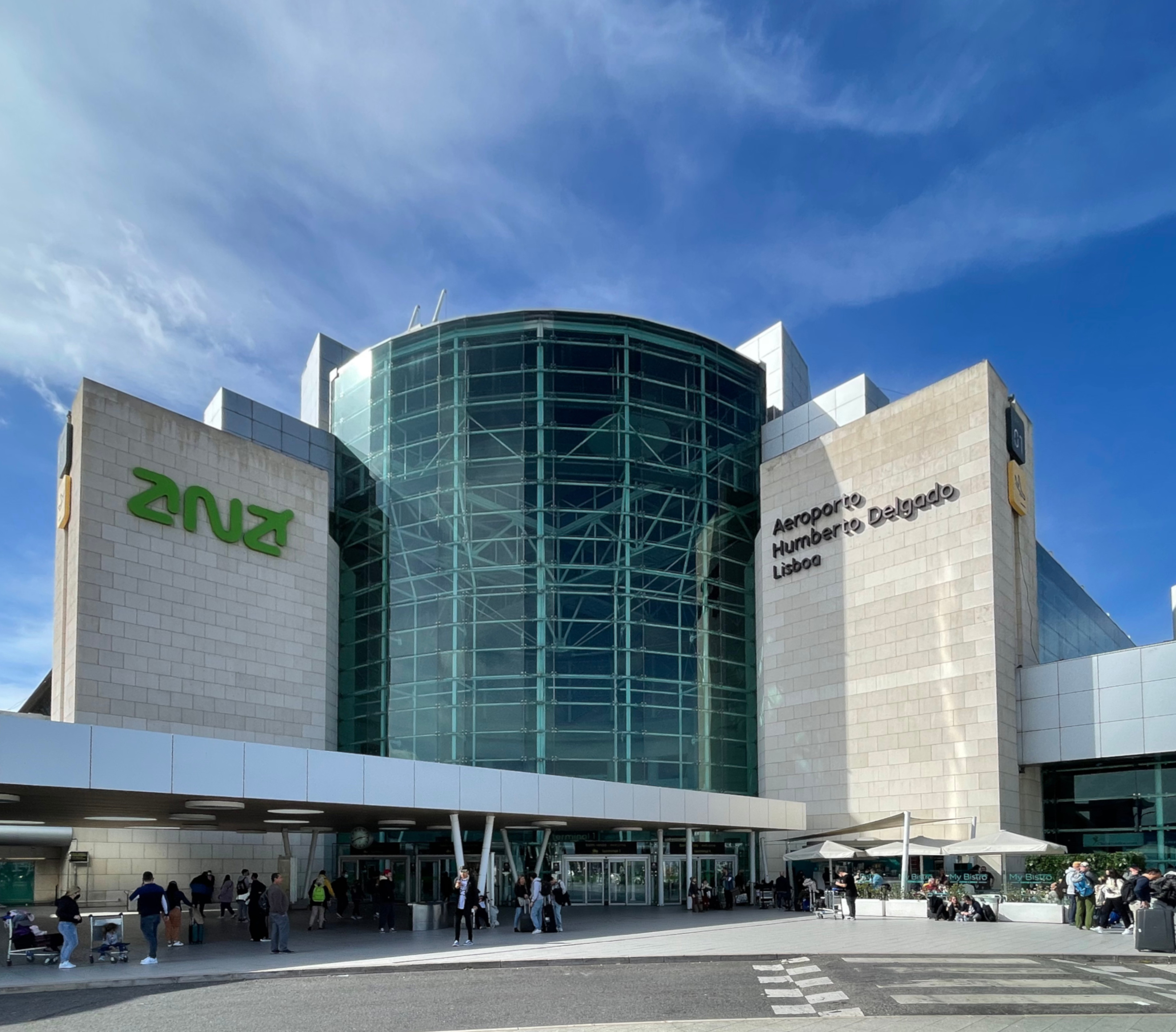
Lisbon airport

Humberto Delgado Airport is located within the city limits.

It is the headquarters and hub for TAP Portugal as well as a hub for EasyJet, Azores Airlines, Ryanair, EuroAtlantic Airways, White Airways, and Hi Fly. Having served 36.1 million passengers in 2025, it is by far the busiest airport in Portugal, the third busiest in the Iberian Peninsula and the 13th busiest in Europe.

A second airport has been proposed and the project was initially put on hold because of the Portuguese and European economic crisis, and also because of the long discussion on whether a new airport was needed. In 2023 there were still 9 possible sites who are thought to be able to host the future New Lisbon airport. Finally, in 2024, the new government announced that the new international airport would be located in Alcochete, just across the Tagus from Lisbon.

Cascais Municipal Aerodrome, 20 km west of the city centre in Cascais and hub for Sevenair, offers commercial domestic flights to Bragança, Portimão, Viseu and Vila Real. This location is where many of the country's aviation schools are concentrated.

=== Cycling ===
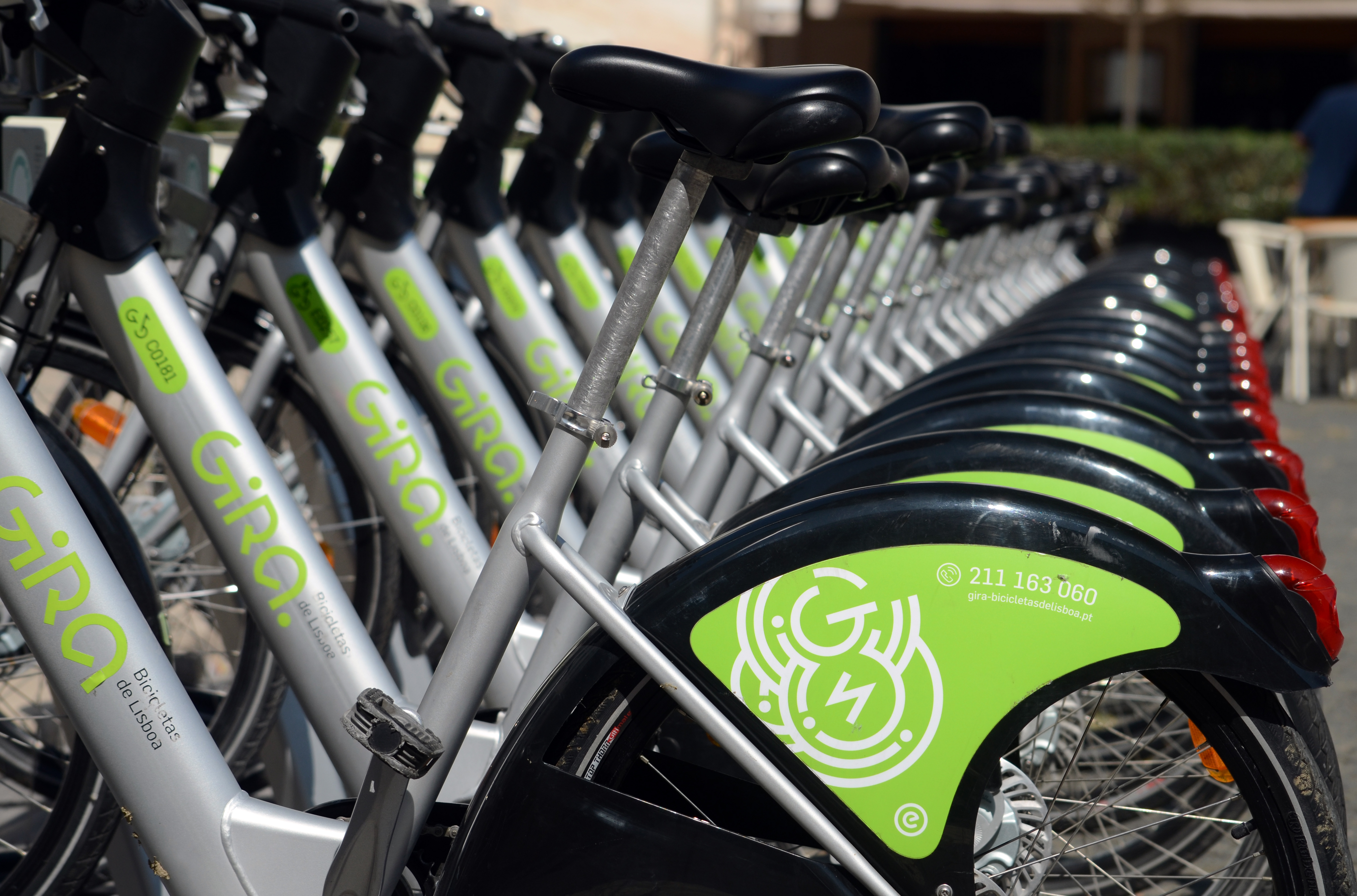
Gira recharging station

Following the COVID-19 pandemic, Lisbon saw a significant increase in cycling and planned to expand the current Gira bike hire system from 1,600 bikes to 2,600 by the end of 2023. Many of these bicycles are electric to deal with Lisbon's hills. The city also plans to expand the number of bike recharging stations, now standing at 146. Gira service is integrated in the public transportation system, as youth up to 23 years old and seniors over 65 years old can use the service for free, while for other residents bikes are included in the Navegante card.

In 2023, there were over 200 km (120 mi) of bike lanes within the city's administrative area and the city plans to expand its network of cycle paths in the coming years.

=== Public transportation statistics ===
The average amount of time people spend commuting with public transit in Lisbon on a weekday is 59 minutes. 11.5% of public transit riders ride for more than 2 hours every day. The average amount of time spent waiting at a stop or station for public transit is 14 min, while 23.1% of riders wait for over 20 minutes on average every day. The average distance people usually ride in a single trip with public transit is 6 kilometres (3.7 mi), while 10% travel for over 12 kilometres (7.5 mi) in a single direction.

=== Car ===
Lisbon is connected to its suburbs and throughout Portugal by an extensive motorway network. There are three circular motorways around the city; the 2ª Circular, the IC17 (CRIL), and the A9 (CREL).

== Education ==
=== International schools ===
In the Greater Lisbon area, particularly in the Portuguese Riviera, an area popular with expats and foreign nationals, there are numerous international schools, including the Carlucci American International School of Lisbon (the only American school in Portugal), Saint Julian's School (British), Saint Dominic's International School (British), Deutsche Schule Lissabon (German), Instituto Español Giner de los Ríos (Spanish), Oerias Internacional School (IB), and Lycée Français Charles Lepierre (French).

=== Higher education ===
In the city, there are three public universities and a university institute. The University of Lisbon, which is the largest university in Portugal, was created in 2013 with the union of the Technical University of Lisbon and the Classical University of Lisbon (which was known as the University of Lisbon). The New University of Lisbon, founded in 1973, is another public university in Lisbon and is known internationally by its Nova School of Business and Economics (Nova SBE), its economics and management faculty. The third public university is Universidade Aberta. Additionally, there's ISCTE - Lisbon University Institute (founded in 1972), a university institute that provides degrees in all academic disciplines.

Major private institutions of higher education include the Portuguese Catholic University, focused on law and management, as well as the Lusíada University, the Universidade Lusófona, and the Universidade Autónoma de Lisboa, among others.

The total number of enrolled students in higher education in Lisbon was, for the 2019–2020 school year, nearly 153,000 students, of which 18,000 were of foreign nationality.

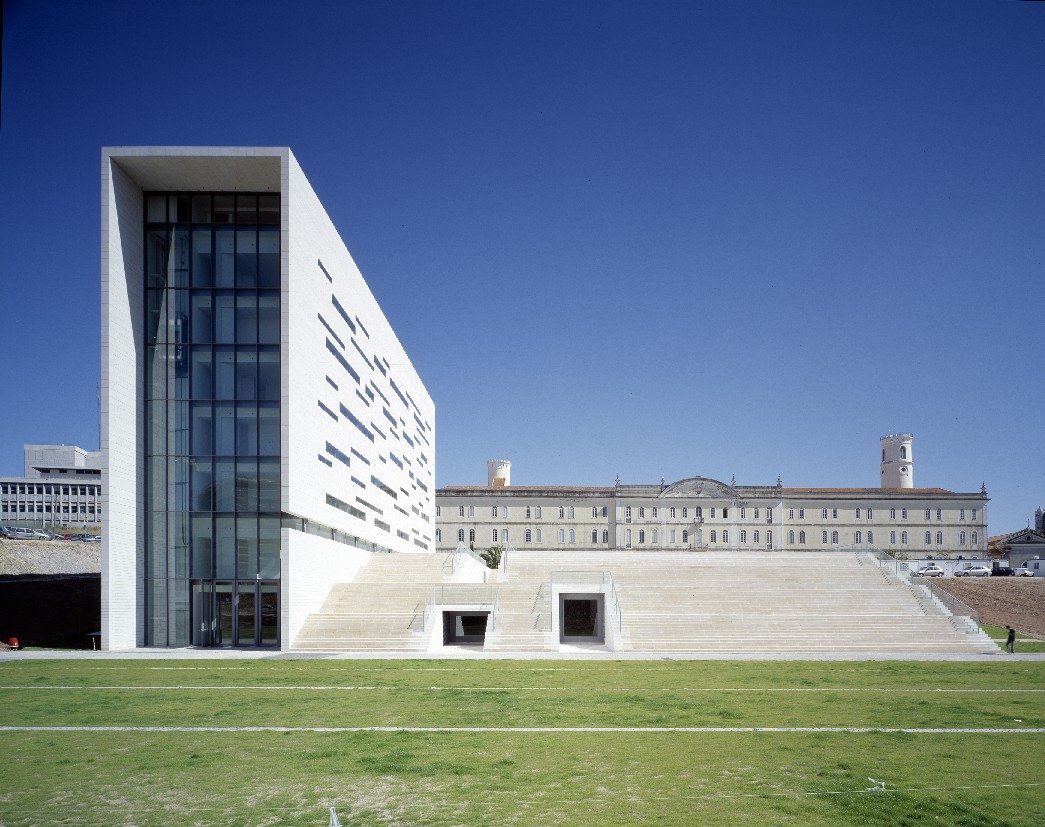
The rectory and main campus of the New University of Lisbon

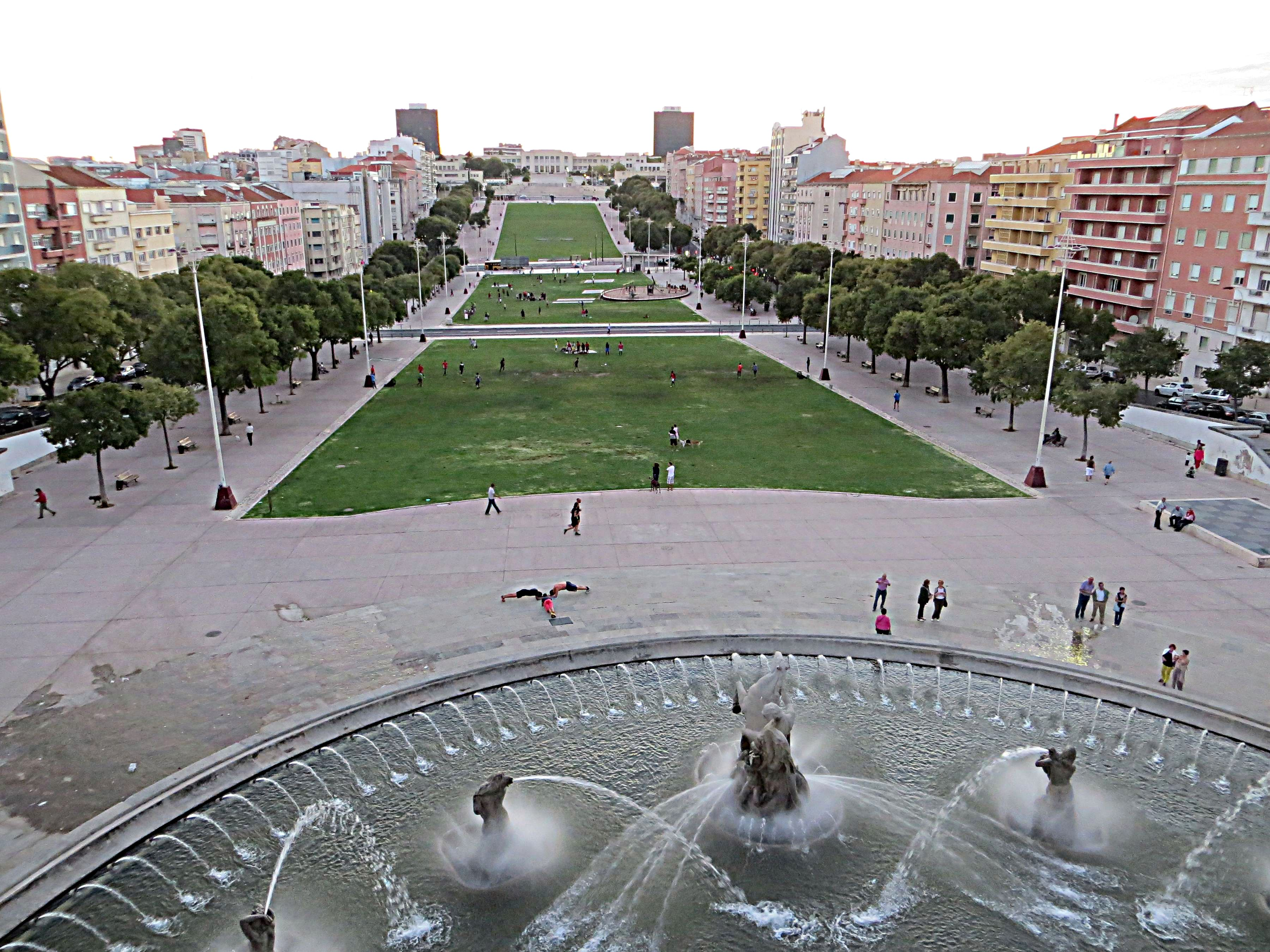
Instituto Superior Técnico, at the top, which belongs to the University of Lisbon, is based on the Alameda D. Afonso Henriques.

=== Libraries ===
Lisbon is home to Biblioteca Nacional de Portugal, the Portuguese national library, which has over 3 million books and manuscripts. The library has some rare books and manuscripts, such as an original Gutenberg Bible and original books by Erasmus, Christophe Platin, and Aldus Manutius. Torre do Tombo, the national archive, is one of the most important archives in the world, with over 600 years and one of the oldest active Portuguese institutions. There are, among several others, the Arquivo Histórico Ultramarino and the Arquivo Histórico Militar.

== Sports ==
Lisbon has a long tradition in sports. It hosted several matches, including the final, of the UEFA Euro 2004 championship. The city also played host to the final of the 2001 IAAF World Indoor Championships and the European Fencing Championships in 1983 and 1992, as well as the 2003 World Men's Handball Championship, and the 2008 European Judo Championships. From 2006 to 2008, Lisbon was the starting point for the Dakar Rally. The city hosted the 2014 and 2020 UEFA Champions League finals. In 2008 and 2016, the city hosted the European Triathlon Championships. Lisbon has a leg at the Volvo Ocean Race. It is one of the potential host cities for the 2030 FIFA World Cup.

=== Football ===
The city hosts three association football clubs in Portugal's highest league, the Primeira Liga. Sport Lisboa e Benfica, commonly known as simply Benfica, has won 38 league titles in addition to two European Cups. Lisbon's second-most successful club is Sporting Clube de Portugal (commonly known as Sporting and often referred to as Sporting Lisbon abroad to prevent confusion with other teams with the same name), winner of 20 league titles and the UEFA Cup Winners' Cup. A third club, C.F. Os Belenenses (commonly Belenenses or Belenenses Lisbon), based in the Belém quarter, has solely won one league title. Other major clubs in Lisbon include Atlético, Casa Pia, and Oriental.

Lisbon has two UEFA category four stadiums; Benfica's Estádio da Luz (Stadium of Light), with a capacity of over 65,000 and Sporting's Estádio José Alvalade, with a capacity of over 50,000. The Estádio da Luz held both the 2014 and 2020 UEFA Champions League Final. There is also Belenenses' Estádio do Restelo, with a capacity of over 19,000. The Estádio Nacional, in nearby Oeiras, has a capacity of 37,000 and was used exclusively for Portuguese international football matches and cup finals until the construction of larger stadia in the city. It held the 1967 European Cup Final.

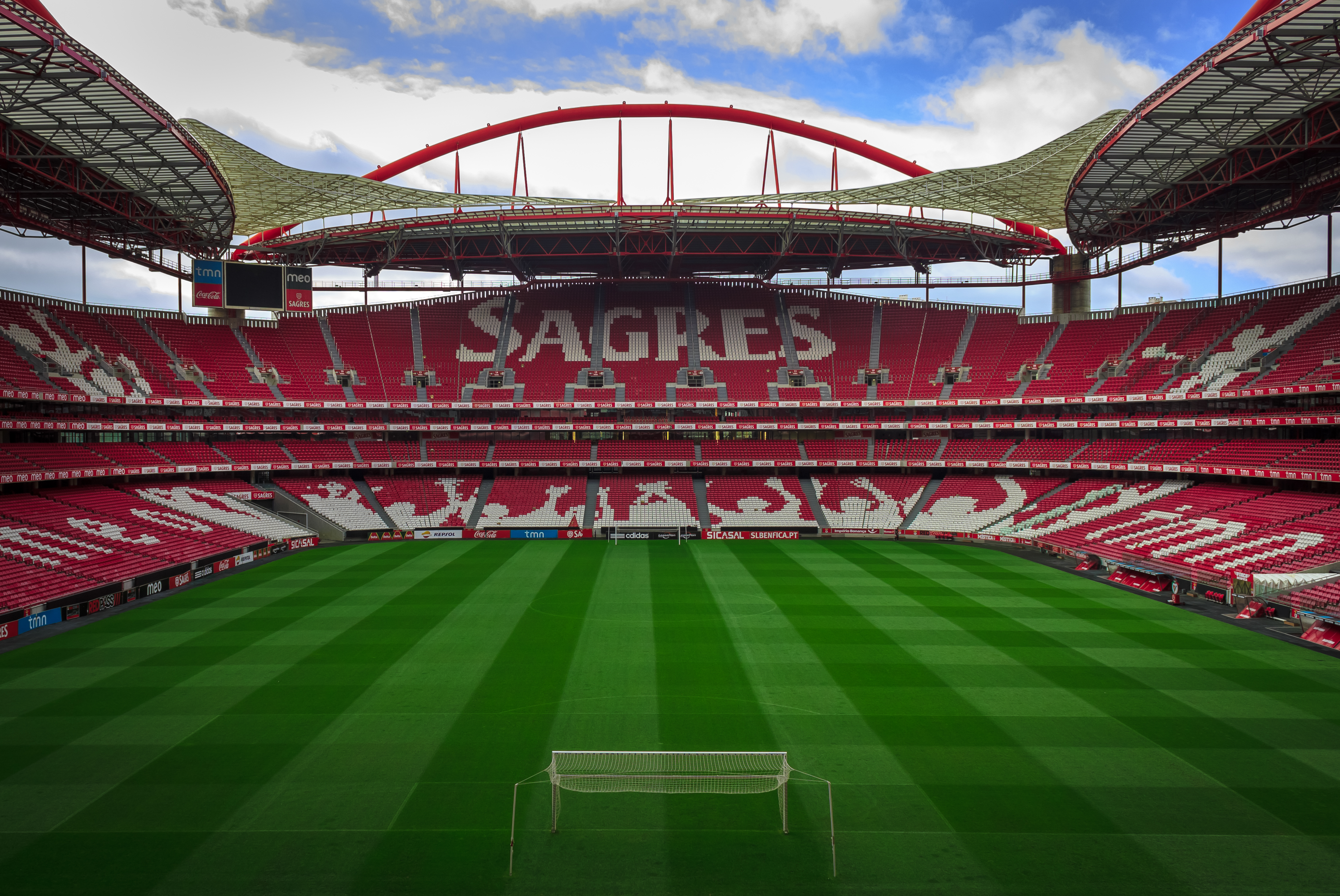
Estádio da Luz, home to S.L. Benfica

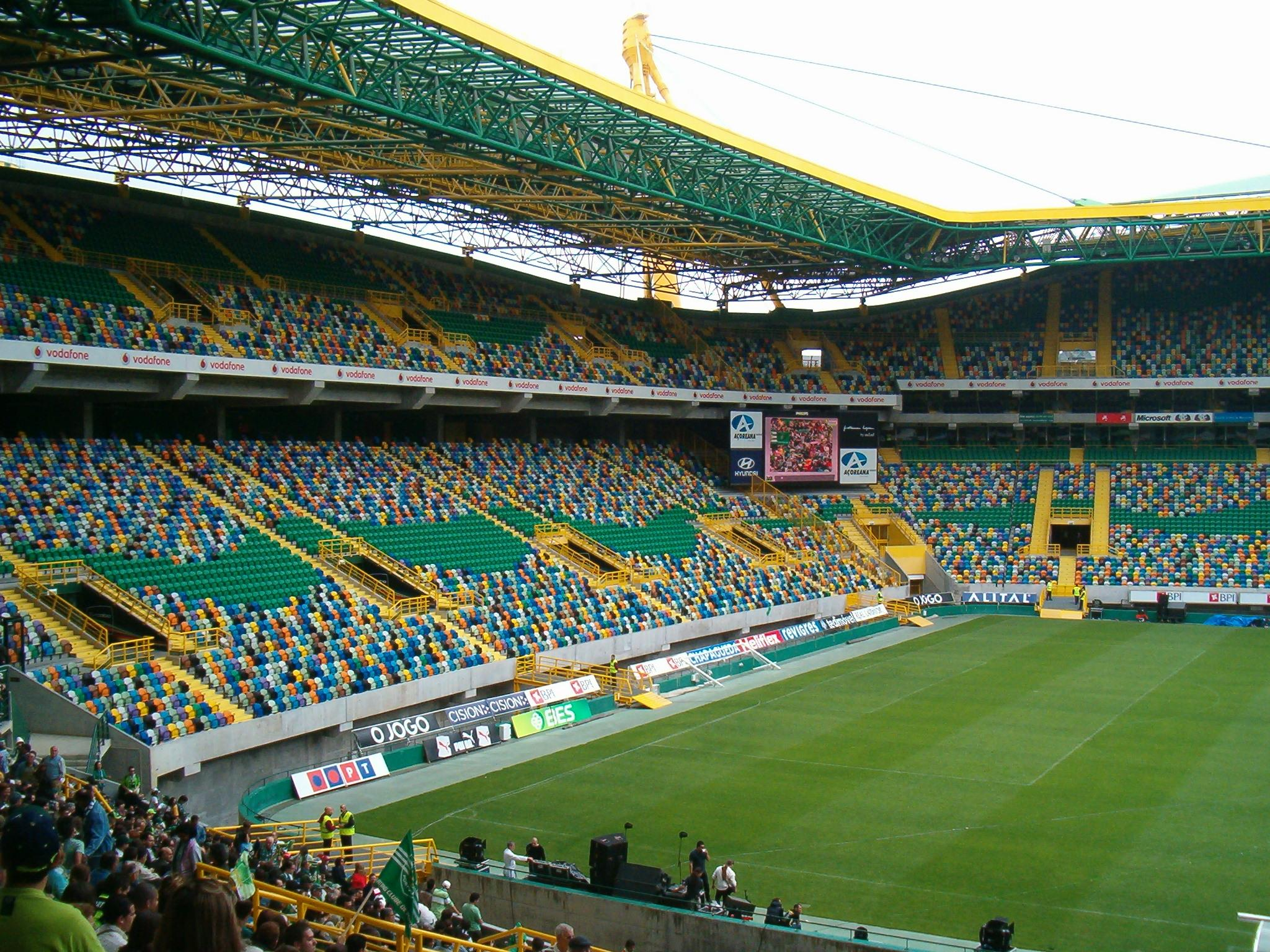
Estádio José Alvalade, home to Sporting CP.

=== Other sports ===
Other sports, such as basketball, futsal, handball, roller hockey, rugby union and volleyball are also popular; the latter's national stadium is in Lisbon. There are many other sports facilities in Lisbon, ranging from athletics, sailing, golfing to mountain-biking. Many golf courses are located in the Lisbon region. Every March the city hosts the Lisbon Half Marathon, while in September the Portugal Half Marathon.

== International relations ==
=== Twin towns – sister cities ===
Lisbon is twinned with:

- Bissau, Guinea-Bissau (1985)
- Budapest, Hungary (1992)
- Cacheu, Guinea-Bissau (1988)
- Fortaleza, Brazil (2016)
- Guimarães, Portugal (1993)
- Luanda, Angola (1988)
- Macau, China (1982)
- Madrid, Spain (1979)
- Malacca City, Malaysia (1984)
- Maputo, Mozambique (1982)
- Praia, Cape Verde (1983)
- Rabat, Morocco (1988)
- Panaji, India
- Rio de Janeiro, Brazil (1980)
- Salvador, Brazil (1995)
- São Tomé, São Tomé and Príncipe (1985)

=== Cooperation agreements ===
Lisbon has additional cooperation agreements with:

- Algiers, Algeria (1988)
- Asunción, Paraguay (2014)
- Bangkok, Thailand (2016)
- Beijing, China (2007)
- Bethlehem, Palestine (1995)
- Buenos Aires, Argentina (1992)
- Curitiba, Brazil (2005)
- Haimen, China (2011)
- Kyiv, Ukraine (2000)
- Miami, United States (1987)
- Montevideo, Uruguay (1993)
- Panaji, India (1989)
- Paris, France (1998)
- Qingdao, China (2010)
- Santa Catarina, Cape Verde (1997)
- Sofia, Bulgaria (2001)
- Toronto, Canada (1987)
- Tunis, Tunisia (1993)
- Zagreb, Croatia (1977)

=== Membership in organisations ===
Lisbon has been part of the Union of Ibero-American Capital Cities since the union's founding on 12 October 1982.

Since 28 June 1985, Lisbon has been part of the Union of Capital Cities of Portuguese Language, along with 22 other cities from Angola, Brazil, Cape Verde, China, East Timor, Guinea-Bissau, Mozambique, Portugal, and São Tomé and Príncipe.

== See also ==
- List of people from Lisbon
- Sporting CP
