= List of airports in Portugal =

There are a total of 46 notable airports in Portugal, including civil and military airfields, located on mainland Portugal and in the Azores and Madeira archipelagos.

Notes:

- The location is the municipality (município or concelho) which in a few instances is preceded by the parish (freguesia).
- The airport name is linked to the English airport name, followed by the Portuguese name.
Cities with Airports in Mainland Portugal
Portuguese airports in the archipelago of Madeira
Portuguese airports in the archipelago of the Azores

Location	Region	ICAO	IATA	Airport name
Mainland Portugal: Public airports
Beja	Alentejo	LPBJ	BYJ	Beja Airport
Braga	Norte	LPBR	BGZ	Braga Airport (Aeródromo Municipal de Braga) (Palmeira, Braga)
Bragança	Norte	LPBG	BGC	Bragança Airport (Aeródromo Municipal de Bragança) (Domestic and International)
Cascais	Lisbon	LPCS	CAT	Lisbon-Cascais Regional Airport (Aeródromo Municipal de Cascais/Costa do Estoril (Tires), São Domingos de Rana)
Castelo Branco	Central	LPCB		Castelo Branco Aerodrome (Aeródromo Municipal de Castelo Branco)
Chaves	Norte	LPCH	CHV	Chaves Airport (Aeródromo Municipal de Chaves)
Coimbra	Central	LPCO	CBP	Coimbra Airport (Aeródromo Municipal Bissaya Barreto:)
Espinho (Paramos, Espinho/Costa Verde)	Norte	LPIN		Espinho Airport (Aeródromo de Espinho)
Évora	Alentejo	LPEV		Évora Airport (Aeródromo de Évora)
Faro	Algarve	LPFR	FAO	Faro Airport (Aeroporto Internacional de Faro)
Leiria	Beira Litoral		QLR	Aeródromo da Gândara
Lisbon (part of the paveway extends into Camarate, Loures)	Lisbon	LPPT	LIS	Lisbon Airport (Aeroporto Internacional Humberto Delgado) or: Lisbon Airport (Aeroporto Internacional de Lisboa) (Lisbon/Loures)
Maia (Municipal da Maia)	Norte	LPVL		Maia Airport (Aeródromo Municipal da Maia [Vilar da Luz]) PDF
Mirandela	Norte	LPMI		Mirandela Aerodrome (Aeródromo Municipal de Mirandela)
Monfortinho, Idanha-a-Nova	Central	LPMF		Monfortinho Airport (Aeródromo Municipal de Monfortinho)
Montargil	Alentejo	LPMO		Morargil Airport (Aeródromo de Morargil)
Ponte de Sor	Alentejo	LPSO	QPS	Ponte de Sor Aerodrome (Aeródromo Municipal Ponte de Sor)
Portimão	Algarve	LPPM	PRM	Portimão Airport (Aeródromo Municipal de Portimão) {Penina, Alvor}
Porto	Norte	LPPR	OPO	Francisco Sá Carneiro Airport (Aeroporto Internacional Francisco Sá Carneiro) {Oporto/Porto(Maia)
Castro Marim	Algarve	LPPV		Praia Verde Airport (Aeródromo da Praia Verde) (Alturas, Castro Marim, near Tavira)
Santa Cruz, Torres Vedras	Central	LPSC		Santa Cruz Airfield (Aeródromo Municipal de Santa Cruz [Torres Vedras])
Vila Real	Norte	LPVR	VRL	Vila Real Airport (Aeródromo Municipal de Vila Real){Vila Real/Douro}
Viseu	Central	LPVZ	VSE	Viseu Airport (Aeródromo Municipal Gonçalves Lobato (Viseu)) (Lordosa, Viseu)
Mainland Portugal: Military airports
Alverca, Vila Franca de Xira	Lisbon	LPAR		Alverca Airbase (Base Aérea de Alverca or Complexo Militar de Alverca)
Beja	Alentejo	LPBJ		Beja Airbase (Base Aérea de Beja)
Lisbon (actually located in Prior Velho-Loures, it shares paveway with the Lisbon Airport)	Lisbon			Figo Maduro Airbase (Base Aérea de Figo Maduro)
Monte Real, Leiria	Central	LPMR		Monte Real Air Base (Base Aérea de Monte Real)
Montijo	Lisbon	LPMT		Montijo Airbase (Base Aérea do Montijo)
Ota, Alenquer	Central	LPOT		Ota Airbase (Base Aérea da Ota)
Ovar	Central (Maceda, Ovar)	LPOV		Ovar Airbase (Base Aérea Ovar or Aeródromo Militar de Ovar)
Santa Margarida, Constância	Central	LP77		Santa Margarida Army Airbase (Campo Militar de Santa Margarida)
Sintra	Lisbon	LPST		Sintra Airbase (Base Aérea de Sintra) (Granja do Marques, Pêro Pinheiro, near Algueirão-Mem Martins)
Tancos, Vila Nova da Barquinha	Central	LPTN		Tancos Airbase (Base Aérea Tancos or Aeródromo Militar de Tancos)
Azores: Public airports
Corvo Island	Azores	LPCR	CVU	Corvo Airport (Aérodromo do Corvo)
Faial Island (Horta)	Azores	LPHR	HOR	Horta Airport (Aeroporto da Horta)
Flores Island	Azores	LPFL	FLW	Flores Airport (Aeroporto das Flores)
Graciosa Island	Azores	LPGR	GRW	Graciosa Airport (Aérodromo da Graciosa)
Pico Island	Azores	LPPI	PIX	Pico Airport (Aeroporto do Pico)
Santa Maria	Azores	LPAZ	SMA	Santa Maria Airport (Aeroporto de Santa Maria)
São Jorge Island	Azores	LPSJ	SJZ	São Jorge Airport (Aérodromo de São Jorge)
São Miguel Island (Ponta Delgada)	Azores	LPPD	PDL	João Paulo II Airport (Aeroporto João Paulo II)
Terceira Island	Azores	LPLA	TER	Lajes Airport (Aeroporto das Lajes)
Azores: Military airports
Terceira Island	Azores	LPLA	TER	Lajes Air Base (Base Aérea das Lajes)
Madeira: Public airports
Madeira Island (Funchal)	Madeira	LPMA	FNC	Cristiano Ronaldo Madeira Airport(Funchal) (Aeroporto da Madeira){Santa Cruz/Madeira}
Porto Santo Island	Madeira	LPPS	PXO	Porto Santo Airport (Aeroporto do Porto Santo) (Vila Baleira)

== See also ==
- Transport in Portugal
- List of airports by ICAO code: L#LP – Portugal
- List of the busiest airports in Portugal
