= Portimão Airport =

Small regional airport in the Algarve

Portimão Airport Aeródromo Municipal de Portimão
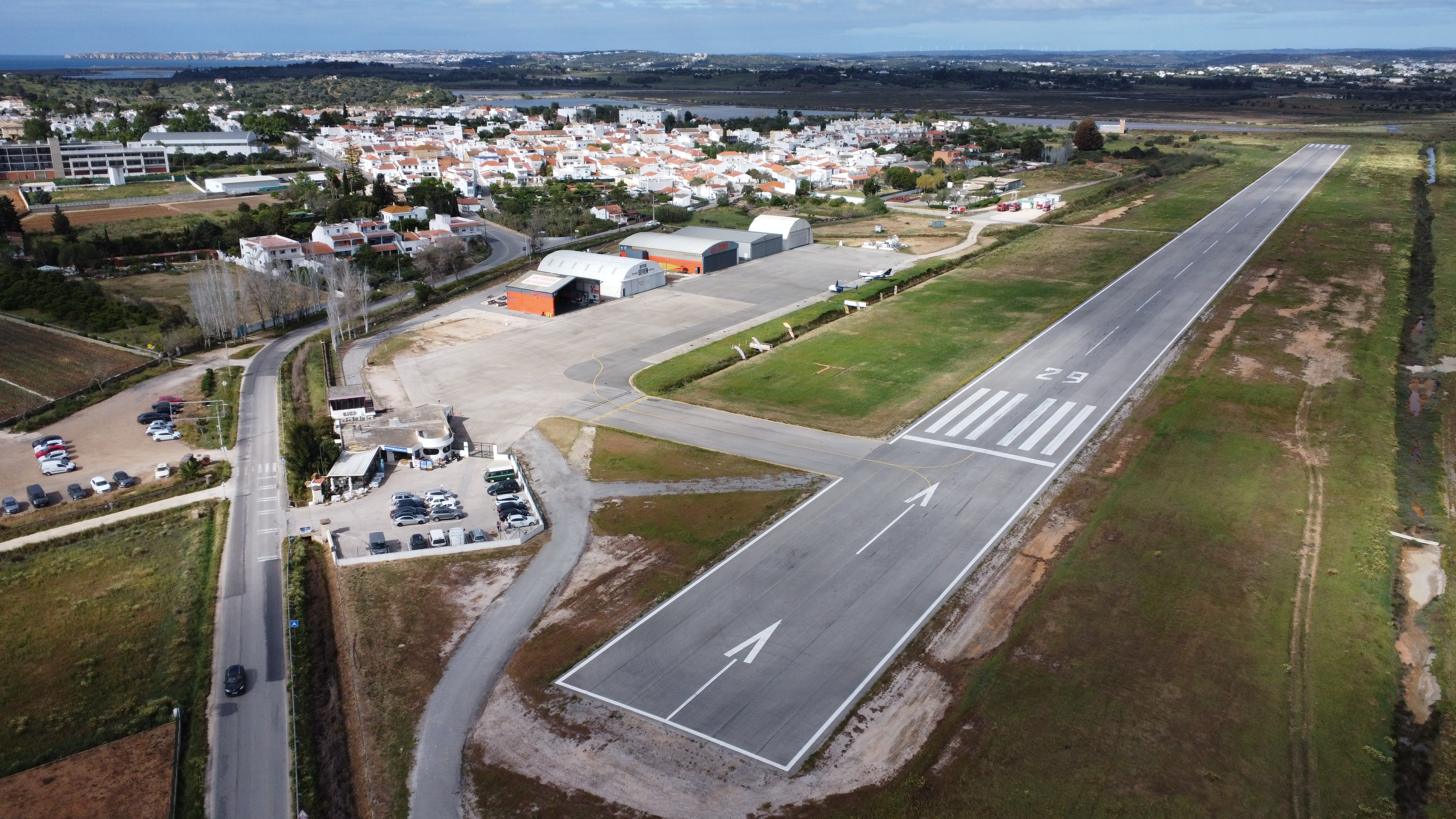
- IATA: PRM; ICAO: LPPM

Summary
- Airport type: Public
- Serves: Portimão
- Elevation AMSL: 5 ft (1.5 m)
- Coordinates: 37°08′51″N 008°34′47″W

Map
- Location within Portugal

Runways
Direction	Length		Surface
Direction	m	ft	Surface
11/29	875	2,870	Asphalt

Portimão Airport (IATA: PRM, ICAO: LPPM) is a small airport in Montes de Alvor, near the city of Portimão in Algarve, Portugal. The airport has one single short asphalt runway in the 11/29 direction and is mainly used by general aviation, with parachuting being common from the airfield.

The local mayor of Portimão, Isilda Gomes, revealed plans to expand the aerodrome and have it become a landing spot for the nearby Algarve International Circuit (AIA). During the celebration of the 50th anniversary of the airport, on August 27, 2021, she said that "the aerodrome should become even bigger and more operational in order to respond more effectively to its needs and create a link with the AIA". Many of the racetrack's visitors arrive in the region in their private jets at Faro Airport when they could be flying directly to the aerodrome in Portimão, which is just a few kilometres away from the racetrack. The municipal council will therefore soon take over an adjacent plot of agricultural land, enabling the needed extension of the runway.

== Airlines and destinations ==
The following airlines operate regular scheduled and charter flights at Portimão Airport:

Airlines	Destinations
Sevenair	Bragança, Lisbon–Cascais, Vila Real, Viseu

== See also ==
- Transport in Portugal
- List of airports in Portugal
