= Montargil Airfield =

- IATA: none; ICAO: LPMO

Summary
- Airport type: Public
- Serves: Montargil, Mora
- Elevation AMSL: 341 ft (104 m)
- Coordinates: 38°59′35″N 8°08′30″W

Map
- Location within Portugal

Runways
Direction	Length		Surface
Direction	m	ft	Surface
06/24	1,145	3,757	Asphalt
- Source: Google Maps GCM

Montargil Airfield (ICAO: LPMO) is a recreational aerodrome serving Montargil and Mora, Portugal. It is sometimes called Morargil, which is a portmanteau of the names of the nearest localities, Mora and Montargil.

Runway length includes approximately 1,200 metres (3,937 ft) displaced thresholds at each end. The Montargil VOR-DME is 5.5 nautical miles (10.2 km) northwest of the airport.

== See also ==
- Transport in Portugal
- List of airports in Portugal
