= Praia Verde Airstrip =

- IATA: none; ICAO: none

Summary
- Airport type: Public
- Serves: Castro Marim
- Elevation AMSL: 10 ft (3.0 m)
- Coordinates: 37°11′35″N 7°28′15″W

Map
- Location within Portugal

Runways
Direction	Length		Surface
Direction	ft	m	Surface
12/30	2,390	730	Unpaved (deteriorated)
- Source: Google Maps

Praia Verde Airstrip is a coastal airstrip in Castro Marim Municipality, Portugal, near the border with Spain.

The airstrip appears abandoned. Google Earth 2006 historical imagery shows a maintained, unpaved runway in use. 2014 imagery shows the runway and ramp area overgrown with weeds and shrubs.

As of 2023, there are indications of use by a gyrocopter operator.

The region is served by Faro International Airport, (IATA: FAO, ICAO: LPFR), 48 kilometres (30 mi) southwest.

The operation of the airfield is solely the responsibility of the operator, as the airfield is officially closed by announcement in NOTAMs and according to the Aeronautical Information Publication (AIP).

== See also ==
- Transport in Portugal
- List of airports in Portugal
