= Bragança Airport =

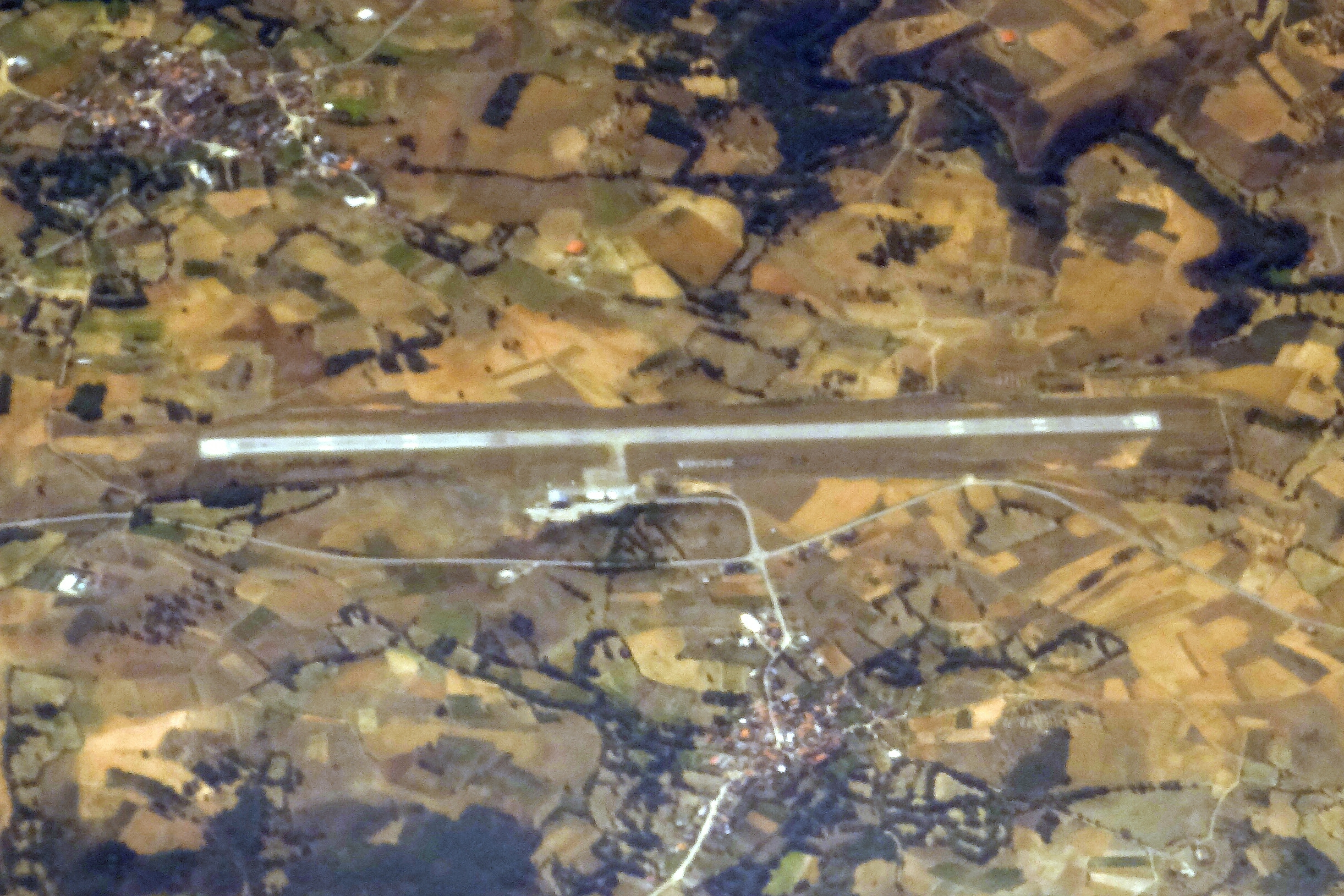
- IATA: BGC; ICAO: LPBG

Summary
- Airport type: Public
- Owner/Operator: Câmara Municipal de Bragança
- Serves: Bragança
- Location: Bairro de Santiago, Lote A, Bloco 1- 4º Esq. 5300 Bragança
- Elevation AMSL: 649 m (2,129 ft)
- Coordinates: 41°51′24″N 006°42′27″W

Map
- Location in Portugal

Runways
Direction	Length		Surface
Direction	m	ft	Surface
01/19	1,700	5,577	Asphalt
- Sources: Portuguese AIP; Câmara Municipal de Bragança

Bragança Airport (Portuguese: Aeródromo de Bragança) (IATA: BGC, ICAO: LPBG) is a regional airport serving Bragança, Portugal. It is located 7.5 km (4.7 mi) north-northeast of the city.

== Airlines and destinations ==
The following airlines operate regular scheduled and charter flights at Bragança Airport:

Airlines	Destinations
Sevenair	Lisbon–Cascais, Portimão, Vila Real, Viseu

== Accidents and incidents ==
- On 8 May 1994, an Aerocondor Britten-Norman Trislander, registered CS-DAF, operating the Lisbon–Bragança route, crash-landed into trees near the airport, following loss of power. There were no reported fatalities but the aircraft was written off.

== See also ==
- Transport in Portugal
- List of airports in Portugal
- National Institute of Civil Aviation of Portugal
