= Maia Airport =

- IATA: QRV; ICAO: LPVL

Summary
- Airport type: Public
- Serves: Maia
- Elevation AMSL: 739 ft / 225 m
- Coordinates: 41°16′45″N 008°31′02″W

Map

Runways
Direction	Length		Surface
Direction	ft	m	Surface
16/34	5,580	1,700	Asphalt
- Source: Google Maps

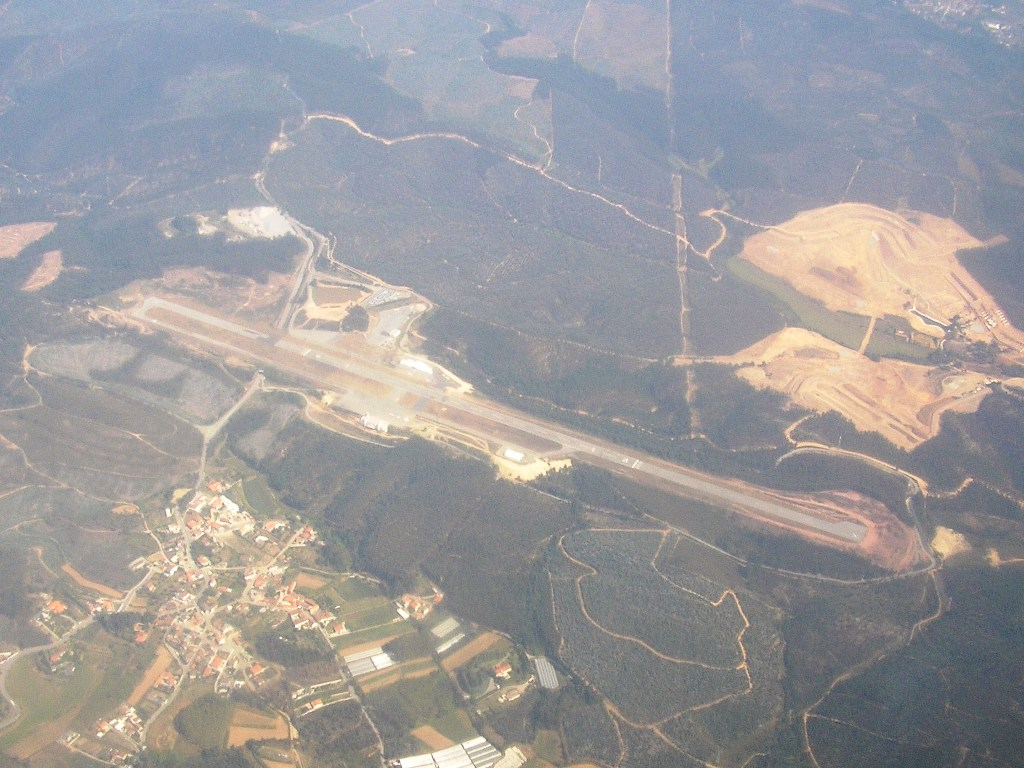
aerial view of Maia aerodrome

Maia Airport (IATA: QRV, ICAO: LPVL) is an airport serving Maia in northern Portugal.

The runway has a 5,606 x 98 ft (1,709 x 30 m) and displaced threshold on each end.

== See also ==
- Transport in Portugal
- List of airports in Portugal
