= Covilhã Airport =

Former airport in Portugal

- IATA: ~~COV~~; ICAO: ~~LPCV~~

Summary
- Airport type: Defunct
- Location: Covilhã in Portugal
- Elevation AMSL: 479 m (1,572 ft)
- Coordinates: 40°15′53″N 007°28′48″W

Map
- Location in Portugal

Runways
Direction	Length		Surface
Direction	m	ft	Surface
~~06/24~~	~~960~~	~~3,150~~	~~Asphalt~~
- Sources: AIP, World Aero Data

Covilhã Airport (Portuguese: Aeroporto de Covilhã) ~~(IATA: COV, ICAO: LPCV)~~ was an airport serving Covilhã, Portugal. The airport was demolished to give place to one of the Portugal Telecom's Data Center. The airport’s IATA code is now being used for Çukurova Airport.

== See also ==
- List of airports in Portugal
