= Aerocondor =

1975–2009 airline in Portugal

ATA Aerocondor Transportes Aéreos Lda
IATA	ICAO	Call sign
2B	ARD	AEROCONDOR
- Founded: 1975
- Commenced operations: 1984
- Ceased operations: 2008
- Operating bases: Cascais (-Tires) Cascais (LPCS)
- Hubs: Cascais (-Tires) Cascais (LPCS)
- Focus cities: Bragança (BGC/LPBG); Vila Real (-Tras os Montes) (VRL/LPVR)
- Fleet size: 8
- Destinations: 7
- Parent company: Aerocondor Group
- Headquarters: Ponte de Sor
- Key people: Victor Brito; Victor João Brito; José Manuel Brito
- Website: Aerocondor

Aerocondor (ATA Aerocondor Transportes Aéreos Lda.) was one of the first private capital Portuguese airlines certified by the Instituto Nacional de Aviação Civil (INAC) (National Institute for Civil Aviation) to transport passengers, as well as operating flight school operations based in Cascais. The regional airline operated scheduled services in mainland Portugal and to Madeira, as well as scheduled passenger services in France and charter services to the United Kingdom and Spain, from bases at Lisbon(-Portela de Sacavem) and Funchal/Madeira(-Santa Cruz/Santa Catarina), and its flight school in Cascais(-Tires) Aerodrome.

== History ==
The airline began operations in 1975, under the auspices of the Aerocondor Group. Aerocondor was founded by former Colonel in the Portuguese Air Force, Victor Brito, with the assistance of his oldest son, Victor João Brito. During the course of its first years, the airline operated regular flights between Bragança and Vila Real, with private passenger and cargo flights to destinations in Europe, Africa and Middle East. It operated a small fleet of robust bi-motor turboprop aircraft.

The need for qualified pilots lead the Aerocondor Group to provide flight-training school operations. This sector was enhanced with the addition of Victor Brito's second oldest son, José Manuel Brito, who served as vice-president of the company.

It was owned by Aerocondor SGPS (85.15%) and Gestair Group (14.85%) and had 90 employees, with headquarters at Cascais Aerodrome. In May 2008, the airline suspended scheduled domestic operations in Portugal.

=== Flight Training ===
Yet, as flight operations failed, its aviation school continued to grow, under the hands of Spanish investors who changed its name to Gestair (between 2010 and 2013), when it became part of the GAir Group. Under this umbrella GAir Training Centres expanded flight school bases into Bergamo (Italy), Madrid (Spain) and a new domestic base at Ponte de Sor Aerodrome, supported by an investment of over 50 million euros. After a year, the school changed their headquarters from their base in Cascais to Ponte de Sor. In 2017, the school was acquired by L3 Technologies, who integrated it into its L3 Commercial Training Solutions division and rebranded it L3 Airline Academy.

== Destinations ==
Aerocondor operated services to the following scheduled domestic destinations:

- Bragança (BGC/LPBG)
- Vila Real (-Tras os Montes) (VRL/LPVR)

In addition, it served international seasonal services to and from Agen and Bragança, as well as charter fights between the islands of Madeira and Porto Santo.

== Fleet ==
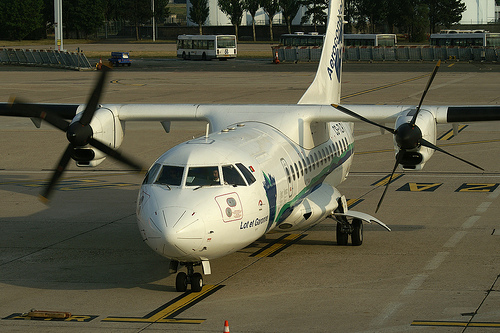
Aerocondor ATR 42

Since June 2008, Aerocondor is not in possession of any aircraft any more due to financial problems. Initial plans were to purchase or lease Boeing 757 or 767 aircraft in order to expand, but instead bankruptcy was declared. Formerly operated aircraft include:

- ATR 42-300
- Dornier 228
- Shorts 360
- Piper Chieftain (for air taxi services)
