= Espinho Airfield =

- IATA: none; ICAO: LPIN

Summary
- Airport type: Public
- Operator: Aero Clube Da Costa Verde
- Serves: Espinho
- Elevation AMSL: 10 ft / 3 m
- Coordinates: 40°58′25″N 8°38′40″W

Map

Runways
Direction	Length		Surface
Direction	ft	m	Surface
17/35	1,380	420	Concrete
- Source: Google Maps

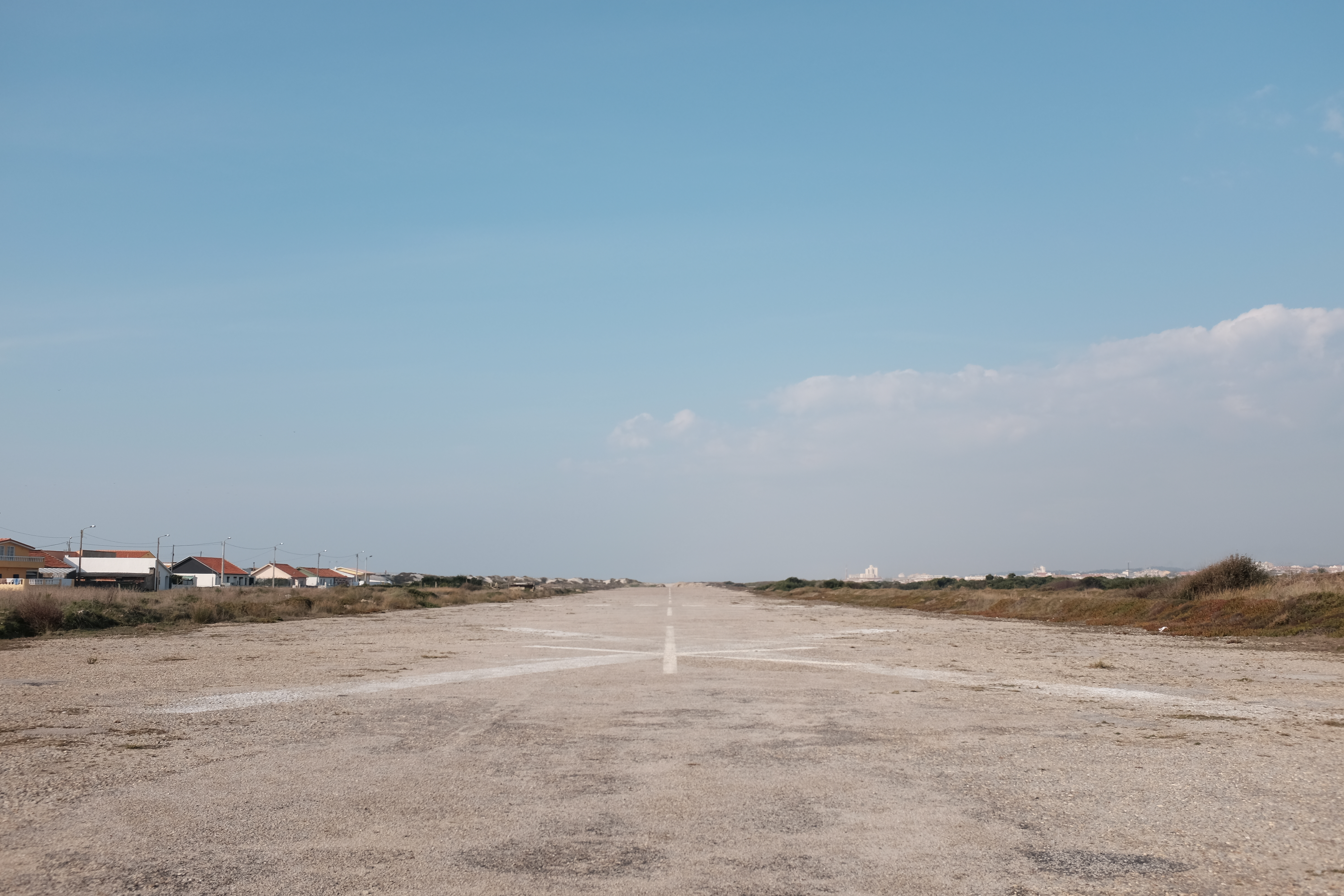
The unused part of the runway at Espinho airfield

Espinho Airfield (ICAO: LPIN) is a recreational aerodrome serving Espinho in northern Portugal.

Originally built for the military, the aerodrome was later reduced in size and handed over to civilian use. After a deadly accident in 2005, a collision between a PA-28 plane and a car on the nearby road, the aerodrome was closed; it has since only been available to ultralight and model aviation.

The main aerodrome area and runway are closed/ built-over, however the Aero Clube da Costa Verde (Portuguese language) operates a flying club and school for ultralight aircraft, marking off 420 metres (1,378 ft) of the original runway's south end for use.

== See also ==
- Transport in Portugal
- List of airports in Portugal
