= Chaves Airfield =

Aerodrome in Portugal

Chaves Airfield Aeródromo Municipal de Chaves
- IATA: none; ICAO: LPCH

Summary
- Airport type: Public
- Serves: Chaves
- Elevation AMSL: 1,181 ft / 360 m
- Coordinates: 41°43′20″N 7°27′50″W

Map

Runways
Direction	Length		Surface
Direction	ft	m	Surface
16/34	2,810	857	Asphalt
- Source: Google Maps

Chaves Airfield (IATA: ---, ICAO: LPCH) is a recreational aerodrome serving Chaves in northern Portugal. There is no commercial air transport.

== See also ==
- Transport in Portugal
- List of airports in Portugal
