= Santa Cruz Airfield (Portugal) =

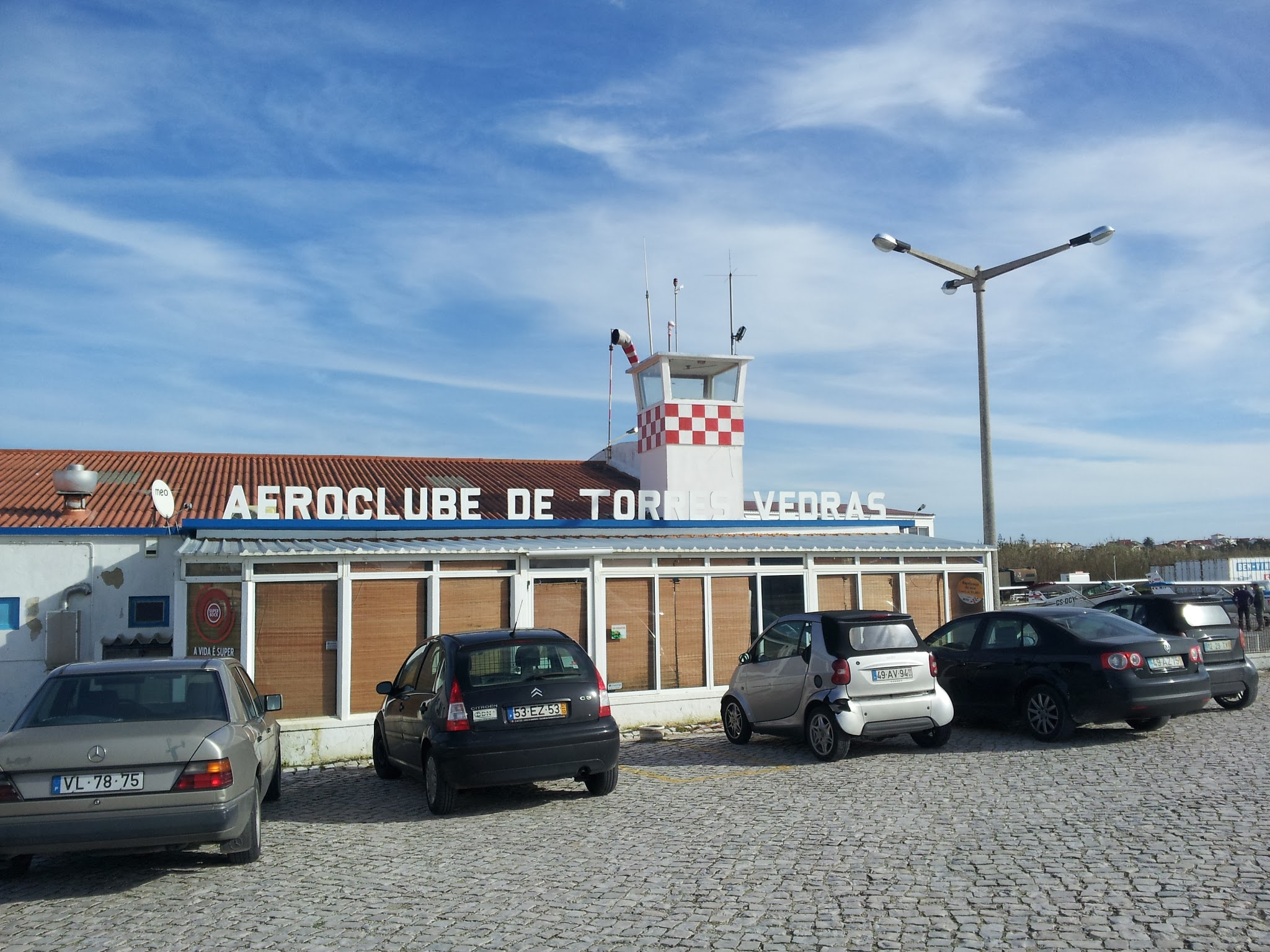
- IATA: none; ICAO: LPSC

Summary
- Elevation AMSL: 157 ft (48 m)
- Coordinates: 39°07′27″N 9°22′49″W

Map
- Location in Portugal

Runways
Direction	Length		Surface
Direction	ft	m	Surface
17/35	2,297	700	Asphalt

Santa Cruz Airfield (ICAO: LPSC) is an aerodrome located in Santa Cruz, some 15 kilometres (9.3 mi) west-northwest of Torres Vedras, Portugal. It accommodates light aircraft.

== See also ==
- Transport in Portugal
- List of airports in Portugal
