= Viseu Airport =

Airport in Portugal

Viseu Airport Aeródromo de Viseu
- IATA: VSE; ICAO: LPVZ

Summary
- Location: Viseu, Portugal
- Elevation AMSL: 2,060 ft (630 m)
- Coordinates: 40°43′40″N 7°53′21″W
- Interactive map of Viseu Airport

Runways
Direction	Length		Surface
Direction	ft	m	Surface
36/18	3,937	1,200	asphalt

Viseu Airport (IATA: VSE, ICAO: LPVZ), also known as Gonçalves Lobato Airport, is an airport in Viseu, Portugal.

== Airlines and destinations ==
The following airlines operate regular scheduled and charter flights at Viseu Airport:

Airlines	Destinations
Sevenair	Bragança, Lisbon–Cascais, Portimão, Vila Real

== See also ==
- Transport in Portugal
- List of airports in Portugal
