= Beja Airport =

Airport in Portugal

Beja Airport Aeroporto de Beja
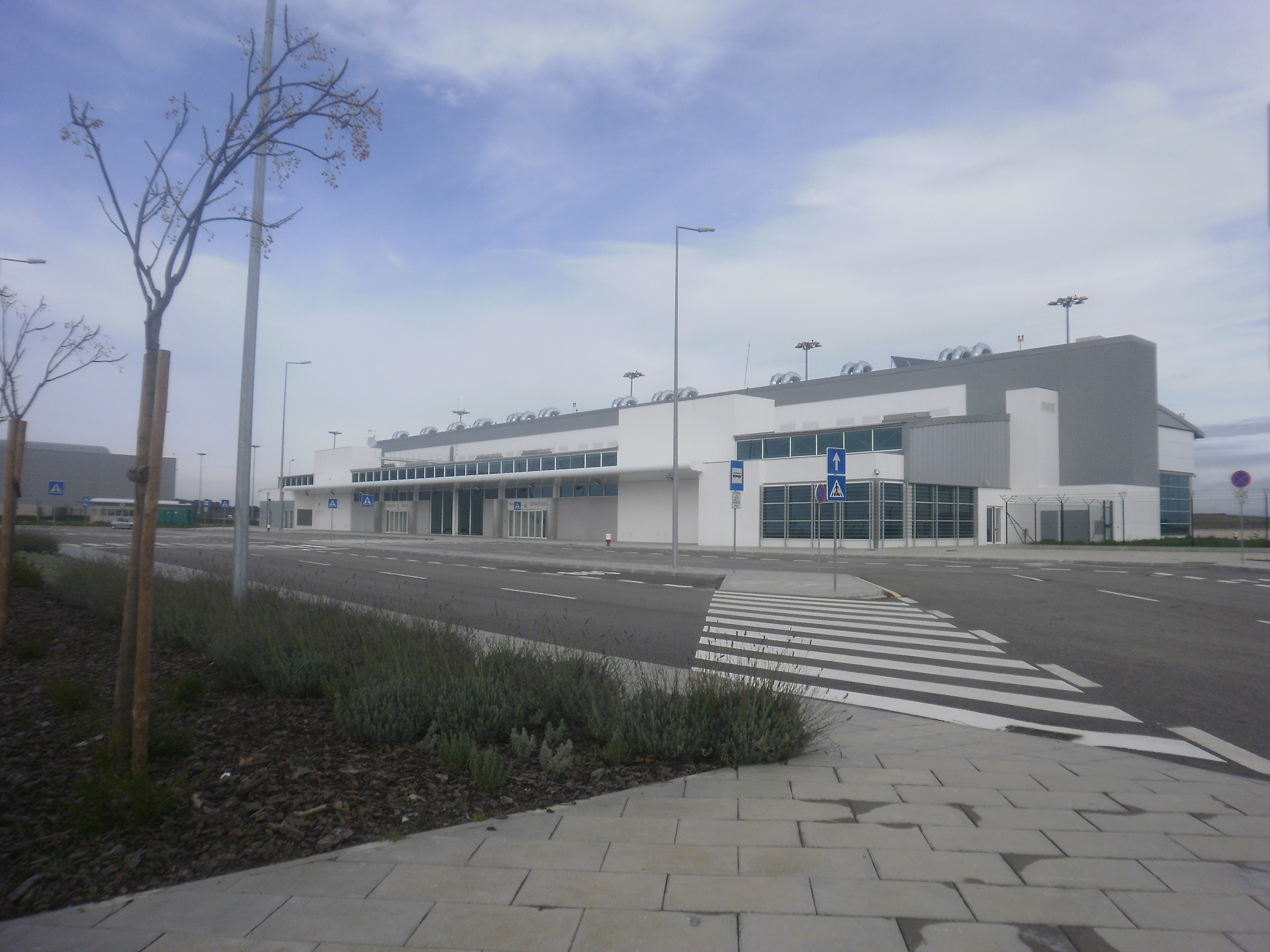
- IATA: BYJ; ICAO: LPBJ

Summary
- Airport type: Public / Military
- Owner: Government of Portugal
- Operator: ANA Aeroportos de Portugal
- Serves: Beja
- Location: Beja, Portugal
- Opened: 15 April 2011; 15 years ago
- Built: 21 October 1964; 61 years ago
- Elevation AMSL: 636 ft / 194 m
- Coordinates: 38°04′44″N 007°55′57″W
- Website: ana.pt

Map
- Location within Portugal

Runways
Direction	Length		Surface
Direction	m	ft	Surface
01L/19R	3,450	11,319	Asphalt
01R/19L	2,951	9,682	Asphalt

Statistics (2018)
- Passengers: 5,096
- Passengers change 17-18: ▲337.0%
- Aircraft movements: 114
- Movements change 17-18: ▲171.4%
- Sources: Portuguese AIP, ANA Aeroportos de Portugal

Beja Airport (IATA: BYJ, ICAO: LPBJ) is an airport and military air base serving the town of Beja in Portugal. It was opened on 15 April 2011.

== Location ==
Beja Airport, located 9 km (5.6 mi) northwest of Beja, is approximately 150 km (93 mi) southeasst of Lisbon, 120 kilometres (75 mi) north of Faro and less than 60 kilometres (37 miles) from Spain.

== History ==
An airbase was established on 21 October 1964, originally built to serve as a training facility for the West German Air Force, due to airspace limitations within West Germany. Until 1993, it was used particularly for weapons training, and in 1987 the Portuguese Air Force's 103 Squadron and its Lockheed T-33 and Northrop T-38 aircraft was relocated from Montijo. After their arrival, the base started to host a mixed array of fixed and rotary-wing trainers, as well as maritime patrol aircraft.

Along with the airports in Lisbon, Porto, Faro, Funchal (Madeira), Porto Santo, Flores, Santa Maria, Ponta Delgada and Horta, the airport's concessions to provide support to civil aviation was conceded to ANA Aeroportos de Portugal on 18 December 1998, under provisions of decree 404/98. With this concession, ANA also provided the planning, development and construction of future infrastructure.

In 2011, a new civilian terminal was built and Beja became a dual-use military-civilian airport, aiming to attract low-cost carriers. The inaugural flight to Praia, Cape Verde, took place on 13 April 2011. There were also charter flights to the United Kingdom.

In spite of being the only Portuguese airport in Alentejo—the biggest Portuguese region, with an area comparable to the size of Belgium—the airport failed to attract the attention of low-cost carriers and has never had any scheduled regular flights. As of September 2012, plans to reconvert it into cargo use are under discussion. It may possibly be a logistics platform between the goods that are shipped to the nearby Port of Sines and the whole of Europe.

In September 2013, it was announced that Aigle Azur would start seasonal flights from Paris to Beja but the airline filed for bankruptcy and was placed in receivership on 2 September 2019. As of September 2012, the future of the airport remains uncertain. The authorities are studying the possibility of reconverting the airport to cargo use.

While the airport has no scheduled passenger flights, it occasionally operates charter flights. The airport is primarily used by Hi Fly and its Maltese subsidiary for parking aircraft. A related sister company is also building a new hangar at the airport for the maintenance of both Hi Fly planes and third-party Airbus aircraft, supplementing its operations at Humberto Delgado Airport.

== See also ==
- Transport in Portugal
- List of airports in Portugal
