= Vila Real Airport =

Vila Real Airport Aeródromo Municipal de Vila Real
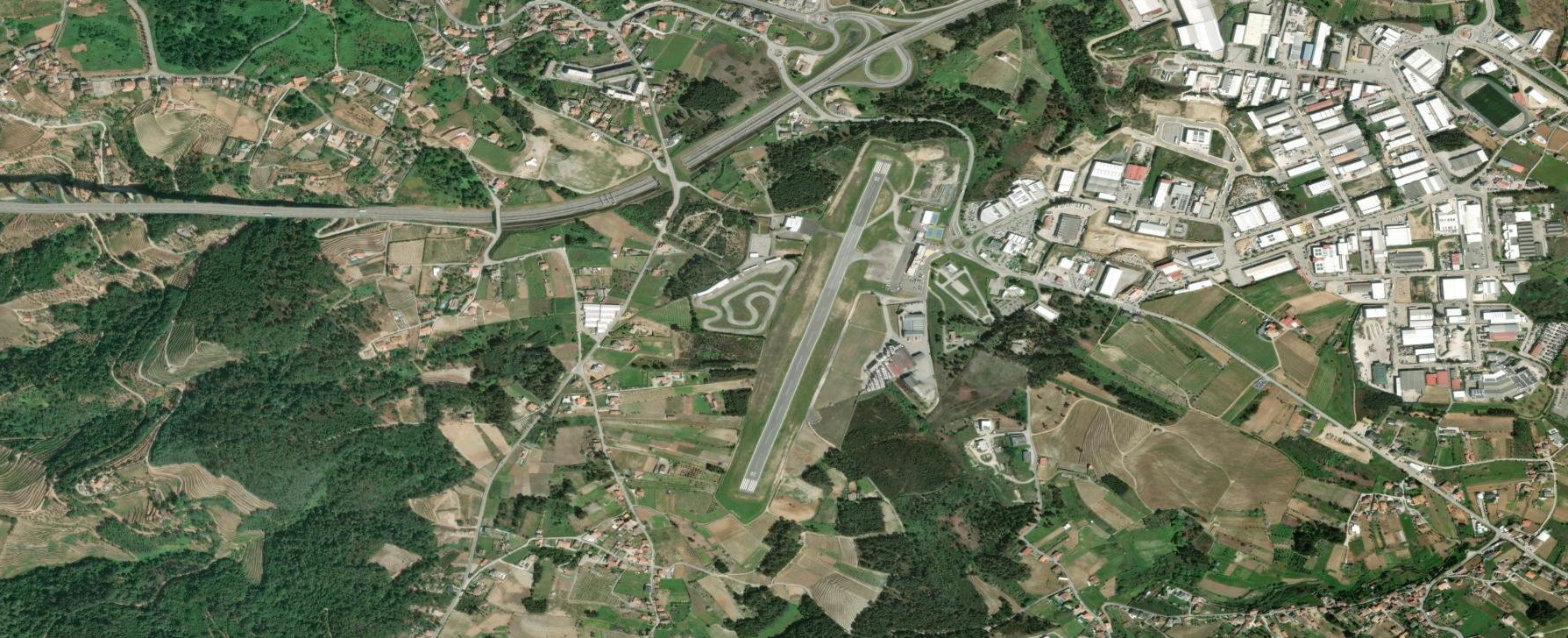
- IATA: VRL; ICAO: LPVR

Summary
- Airport type: Public
- Location: Vila Real, Portugal
- Elevation AMSL: 558 m (1,831 ft)
- Coordinates: 41°16′39″N 7°43′11″W

Map
- Location in Portugal

Runways
Direction	Length		Surface
Direction	m	ft	Surface
02/20	946	3,104	Concrete/asphalt
- Source: Portuguese AIP

Vila Real Airport (IATA: VRL, ICAO: LPVR) is an airport located 4 km (2.5 mi) southeast of Vila Real, Portugal.

As of May 2023, a new terminal building is being constructed. This will allow the fire service, police, customs and airclub to have space in a single building. Completion is expected by the end of 2023.

== Airlines and destinations ==
The following airlines operate regular scheduled and charter flights at Vila Real Airport:

Airlines	Destinations
Sevenair	Bragança, Lisbon–Cascais, Portimão, Viseu

== See also ==
- Transport in Portugal
- List of airports in Portugal
