= Évora Airport =

Municipal airport in Portugal

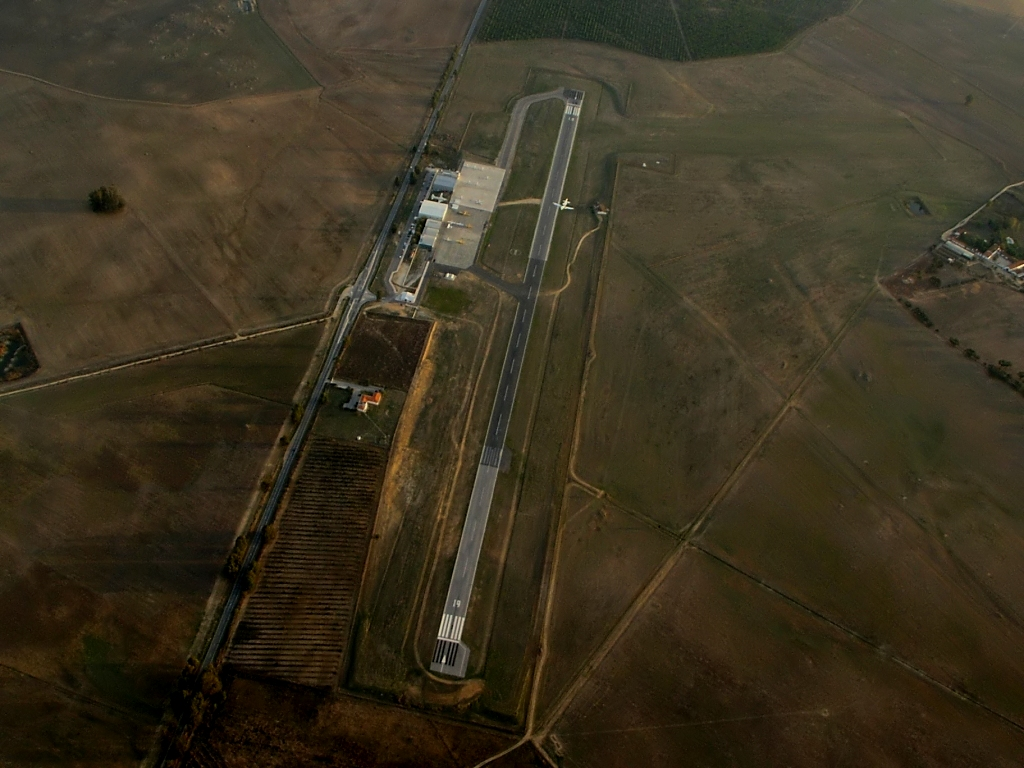
- IATA: none; ICAO: LPEV

Summary
- Airport type: Public
- Serves: Évora
- Elevation AMSL: 248 m (814 ft)
- Coordinates: 38°31′47″N 007°53′31″W

Map
- Location in Portugal

Runways
| Direction | Length | | Surface |
| Direction | m | ft | Surface |
|---|---|---|---|
| 01/19 | 1,300 | 4,265 | Asphalt |
| 08/26 | 640 | 2,100 | Sand |
- Sources: NAV Portugal-VFR Manual

Évora Airport (ICAO: LPEV) is a municipal airport that serves the city of Évora, Portugal.

The airport, located 3.5 km (2.2 mi) south southeast of the city, has two runways, the main runway being 01/19. The second runway, 08/26, is a short sand strip that is rarely used.

Among the services available are a Flight Information Service (FIS), runway lighting (01/19), and a non-directional beacon (NDB) with an approved locator approach to runway 19.

A flying school - CAE Global Academy Évora (Former Academia Aeronáutica de Évora / Aeronautical Academy of Europe) - owned by CAE and part of the CAE Global Academy was based at the airport between late 2000 and December 2012, when it ceased operations.

It is also a popular site for parachuting and glider activities, especially during weekends.
Évora Airport hosted the biannual Portugal Air Show several times up to 2009.

Brazilian aircraft manufacturer Embraer has built two plants just next to the airport, where it builds parts for their Legacy 500 and KC-390 aircraft. The €180M facility was completed August 2012, with production starting early 2013.

== See also ==
- Transport in Portugal
- List of airports in Portugal
