= Coimbra Airfield =

Coimbra Airport Aeródromo Municipal Bissaya Barreto
- IATA: CBP; ICAO: LPCO

Summary
- Airport type: Public
- Operator: Câmara Municipal de Coimbra
- Serves: Coimbra
- Location: Antanhol
- Elevation AMSL: 174 m / 571 ft
- Coordinates: 40°09′22″N 008°28′12″W

Map
- Location in Portugal

Runways
Direction	Length		Surface
Direction	m	ft	Surface
16/34	923	3,028	Asphalt
- Sources: AIP

Bissaya Barreto Aerodrome (Portuguese: Aeródromo Municipal Bissaya Barreto), (IATA: CBP, ICAO: LPCO), is a recreational airfield in Antanhol, near Coimbra.

== Overview ==
Even though most of the airfield's land is located in Antanhol, some believe The Aeródromo Municipal Bissaya Barreto is located in Cernache, but it's not legally true.

It is managed by the Câmara Municipal de Coimbra and is home to several entities like the Aeroclube de Coimbra, I.A.C. - Indústrias Aeronáuticas de Coimbra and Publivoo. The Aero Clube da Figueira da Foz also has its operational base at this airfield.

== Access ==
The only road leading to this airfield passes through Antanhol.

== See also ==
- Transport in Portugal
- List of airports in Portugal
