= Mirandela Aerodrome =

- IATA: none; ICAO: LPMI

Summary
- Airport type: Public
- Serves: Mirandela, Portugal
- Elevation AMSL: 1,329 ft / 405 m
- Coordinates: 41°28′10″N 7°13′35″W

Map

Runways
Direction	Length		Surface
Direction	m	ft	Surface
17/35	747	2,451	Asphalt
- Source: GCM SkyVector

Mirandela Aerodrome (ICAO: LPMI) (Aeródromo Municipal de Mirandela) is a recreational aerodrome serving Mirandela, a town in the Norte Region of Portugal. The aerodrome is located 4 kilometres (2 mi) southwest of Mirandela. The terrain around the airport is uneven. There are large hills 2 kilometres (1.2 mi) west of the runway.

The Mirandela Aero Club has been based there since 1946.

== See also ==
- Transport in Portugal
- List of airports in Portugal
