= ANA Aeroportos de Portugal =

Governing body of airports in Portugal

- Native name: Aeroportos de Portugal, SA
- Type: Subsidiary
- Founded: 1998
- Headquarters: Lisbon, Portugal
- Parent: Vinci Airports
- Website: www.ana.pt

ANA Aeroportos de Portugal is an airport operator in Portugal owned by Vinci Airports. Among others, it operates Portugal's largest airport, Lisbon Airport. The initialism "ANA" stands for Aeroportos e Navegação Aérea, Portuguese for "Airports and Air Navigation".

== History ==
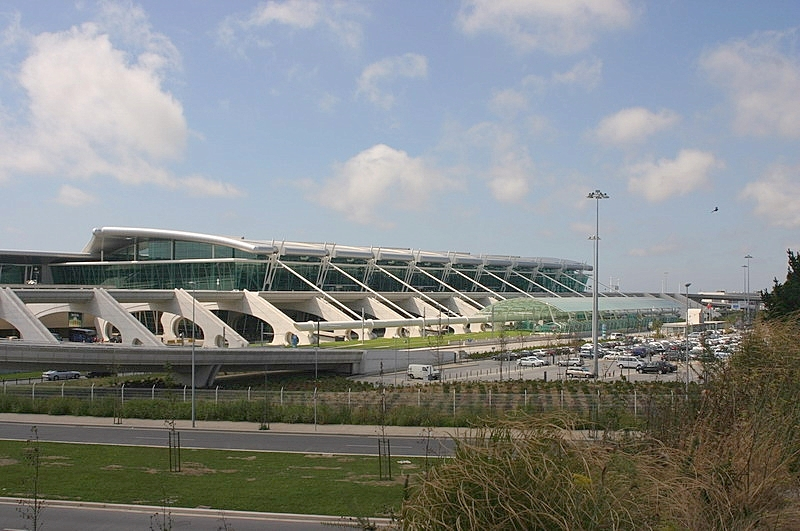
Porto Airport

At the end of the 1980s, a major expansion in both the economy and air traffic was witnessed at the global and national level. For ANA, it was a period of investment in basic infrastructures, with the renewal of the Air Traffic Control systems and the Lisbon, Porto and Faro airports. Airport activities also grew: duty-free shops, rent-a-car offices, parking.

During this period the company's head office was built, in addition to buildings for the Airports' partners: forwarding agents, concessionaires and airlines. It was also a period when the Airports joined several international bodies, such as Eurocontrol, ICAA (International Civil Airports Association) and AOCI (Airport Operators Council International).

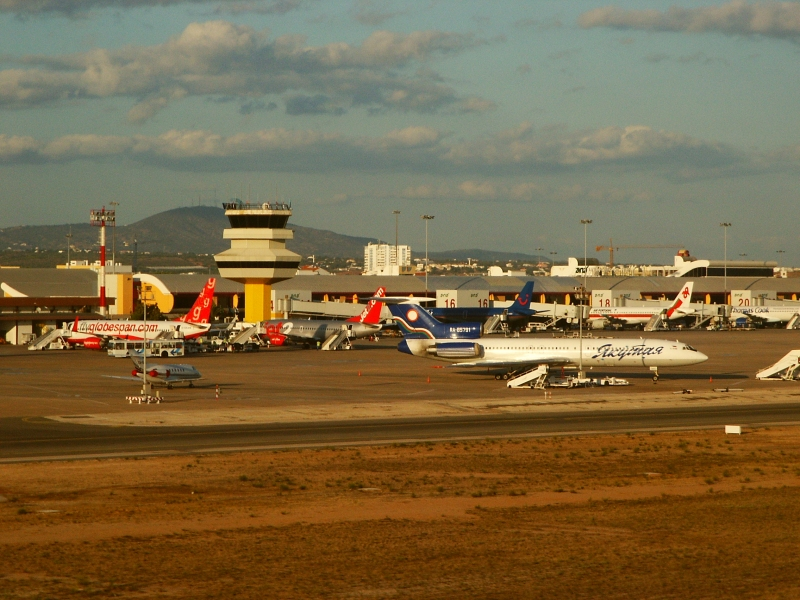
Faro Airport

The 1990s began with the Gulf crisis, which affected both aviation and the world economy. Other sources of instability were the war in Yugoslavia, German reunification and the slowdown in the US economy. These circumstances meant the end of a cycle of self-financing investments for ANA, and the company was forced to seek credit to support its development. Despite these difficulties, infrastructures continued to be strengthened, especially the Lisbon, Faro and Ponta Delgada airports and, in air navigation, the Atlântico project.

In 1991 the liberalization of the European market was extended, with the end of monopolies and tariff controls. These measures brought with them great challenges. In order to confront these, in 1992 ANA carried out a thorough analysis, the keywords of which – Client and Effectiveness – guided the company's growth in the following years.

The result of this analysis was a new direction for the company towards competitiveness. Decentralized management was adopted, which transferred decision-making capacity to the different business areas: Airports, Air Traffic Control Centres, the Commercial Activities Area and the Aeronautical Infrastructures Studies and Projects Area. The structure of the organization became more simplified and effective. A new tariff policy was set up, capable of attracting large clients with a greater cost/benefit relationship. The commercial profitability of the airports was expanded with the awarding of various concessions.

During this period ANA demonstrated its capacity to provide services to third parties, within Portugal and beyond. The Funchal and Macau airports were the first to entrust us with their management. Investment in infrastructures continued, with improvements in the different airports and in the management of air traffic. In a period of expansion in the economy and in air traffic, with intense competition between destinations and airports, ANA's response was continued growth, topped with record performance levels in the year of Expo98, equally in terms of turnover, net profits and investments.

At the end of 1998, ANA Aeroportos, EP, split into two new companies, leaving these a legacy of infrastructures, positive economic and corporate indicators and a culture of competitiveness. ANA – Aeroportos de Portugal, SA, focused on airport management, and NAV, EP, focused on air navigation, were thus born.

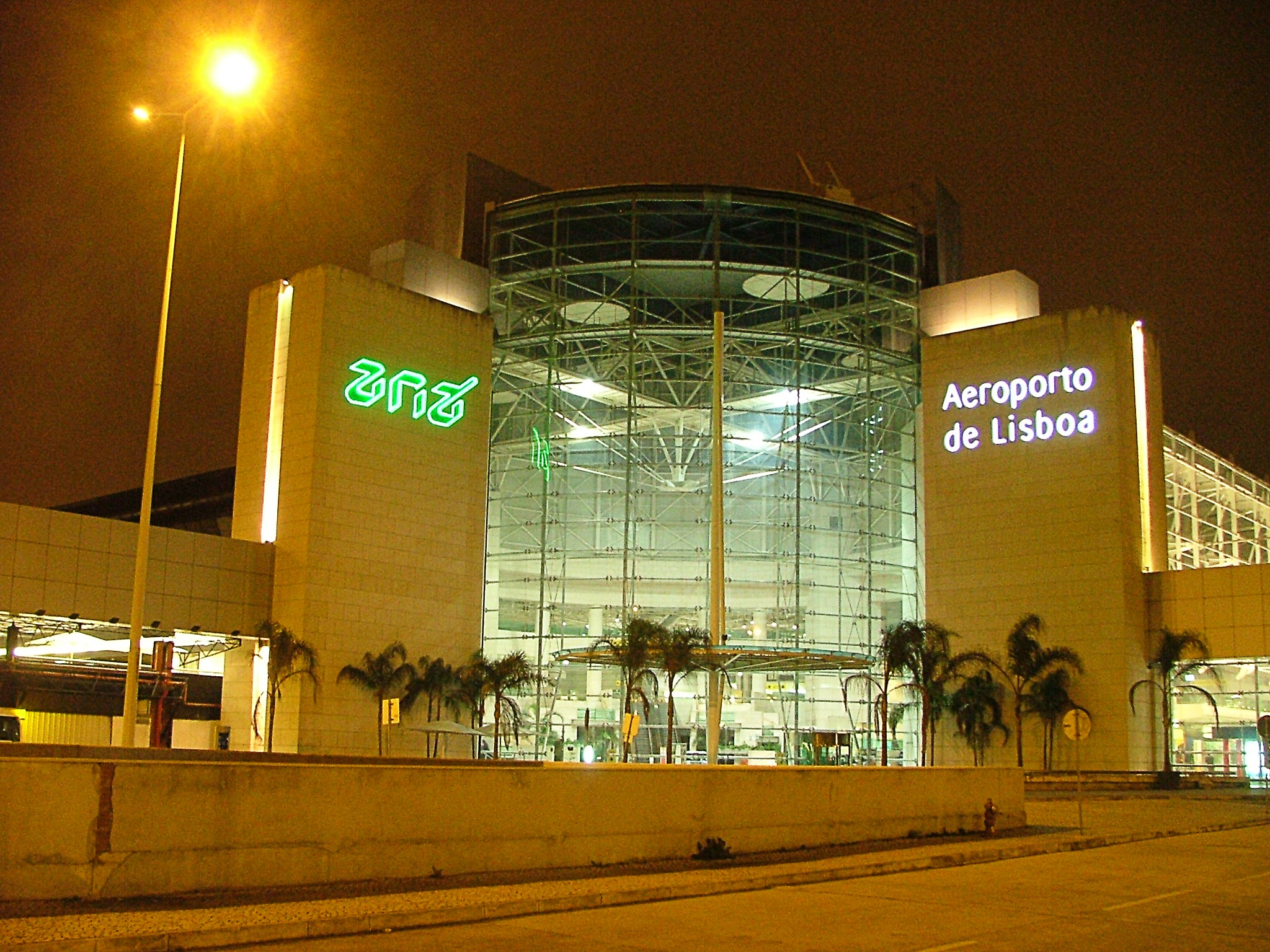
Lisbon Airport with ANA signage

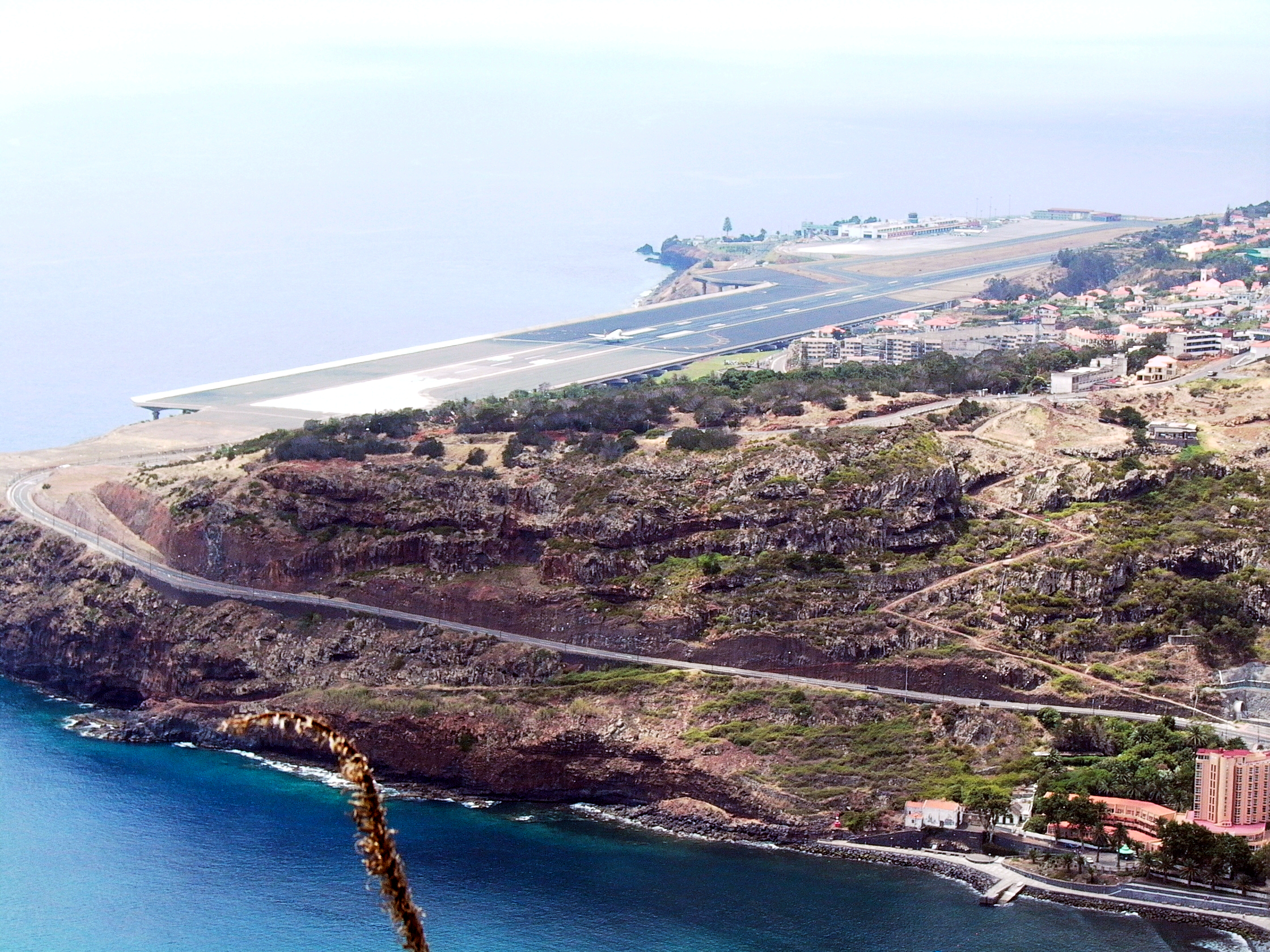
Cristiano Ronaldo International Airport

ANA, SA appeared within a context of accelerated globalization, with the increasingly more intense movement of people and goods. Its competitiveness and that of the country was dependent on its responses to this new situation.

One of these responses was a new strategic vision, which defined ANA as a benchmark group in airport services. The group included, amongst other companies, Portway, a handling operator since 2000, and NAER, set up in 1998 to move forward with the new Lisbon airport.

The government's decision to build the new airport was not only a response to the reported saturation at the Portela airport, but was also to give the country a hub connecting the Atlantic to Europe. The location of the new airport was decided in 1999, followed by its model in 2000: a public-private partnership to be combined with the privatization of ANA itself.

Meanwhile, expansion continued at Portela, aiming the achievement of its full potential, and a new development plan was created for the Sá Carneiro Airport, aimed at allowing it to serve the whole of the North East of Iberia. Cristiano Ronaldo International Airport, then known as Madeira Airport, an example of engineering prowess, opened the archipelago up to large aircraft, and Faro Airport was renovated, with a view to making it the best tourist airport in the Iberian Peninsula.

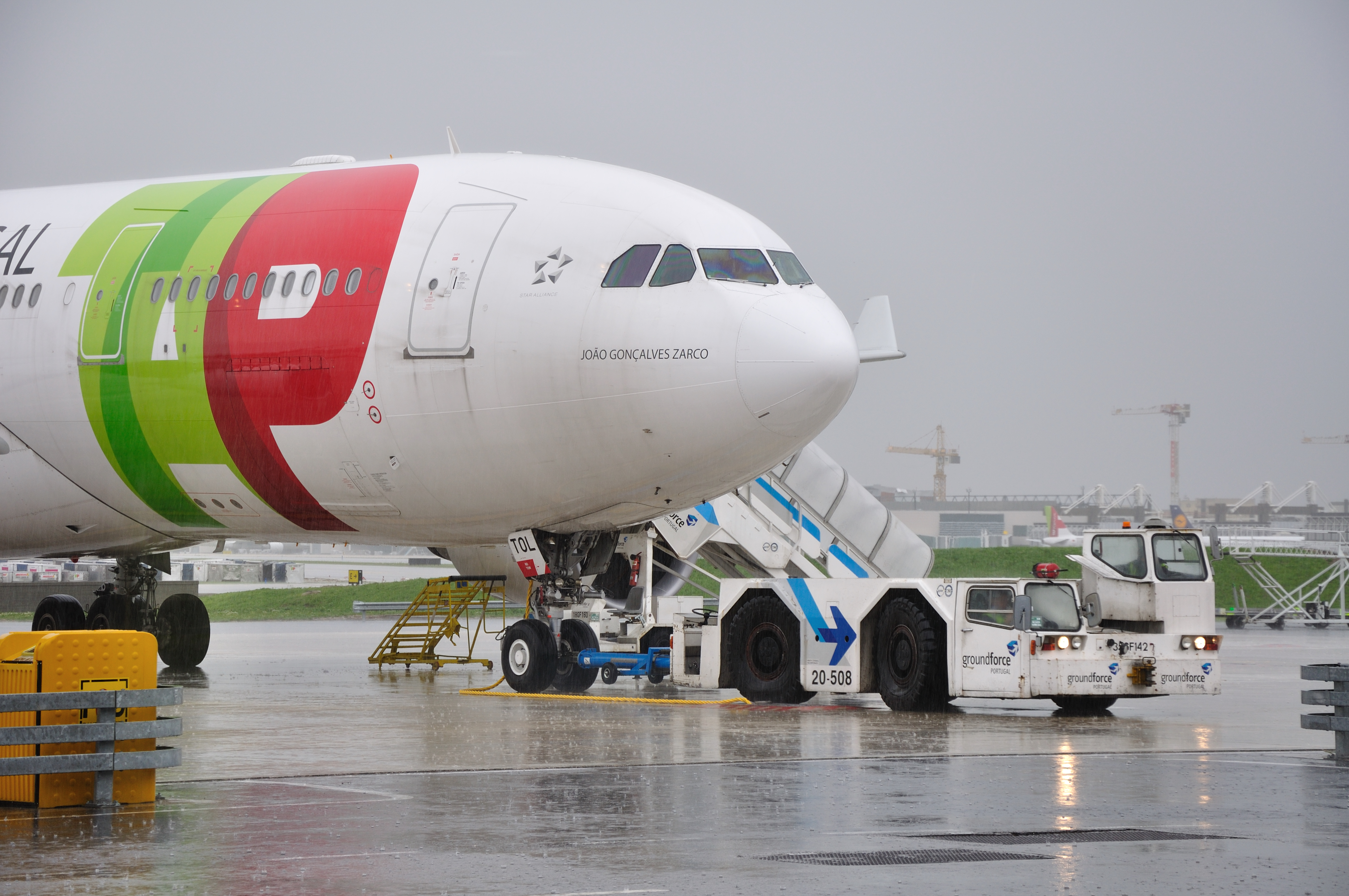
TAP Air Portugal, ANA's biggest client

This focus on expansion and competitiveness suffered a serious setback with the 9/11 attacks. The crisis in the economy and in aviation led to a heavy loss of income, compounded by increased security costs. International instability and Portugal's economic difficulties called into question large projects such as the new Lisbon airport, which the Government suspended in 2004.

In this context, it became even more important to adopt a lighter structure with fewer costs, in which resources and procedures could be shared throughout the group. This restructuring, which took place between 2002 and 2004, was another step in creating the conditions necessary for privatization.

2004, which did not bring the expected takeover, was the year in which ANA's airport traffic began to grow once again. The 2004 European Football Championship contributed to this, but also a successful commercial strategy, with flexible prices and incentives which attracted new airlines, especially low costs.

Airports in Mainland Portugal
Portuguese airports in the archipelago of Madeira
Portuguese airports in the archipelago of the Azores

== ANA Group ==
ANA owns five handling companies.

- PORTWAY – Handling de Portugal, S.A
  - Formed in July 2000, its primary function is to assist and service aircraft on stop-overs at Portuguese airports, commonly referred as handling.
- NAER – Novo Aeroporto, S.A.
  - Created under Portuguese Law Decreto-Lei n.º.109/98 de 24 de Abril, this company, which receives exclusively public funds, was established to develop the projects necessary for the preparation and execution of those decisions to be taken in the process of planning and launching a new airport on the Portuguese mainland.
- ANAM – Aeroportos e Navegação Aérea da Madeira, S.A.
  - Created under Portuguese Law Decreto-Lei n.º.453/91 de 11 de Dezembro, this company, which receives exclusively public funds, was established to study, plan, build and utilise the airports in the Autonomous Region of Madeira.
- ADA – Administração de Aeroportos, Lda.
  - Formed on 12 September 1994 in Macau, its primary function is the administration of airports, specifically the Macau International Airport (AIM) which opened in 1995, four years before the Portuguese handover of Macau. The management contract granted to the company for the Airport of Macau is valid for fifteen years, with an option for renewal.
- FUTURO – Sociedade Gestora de Fundos de Pensões, S.A.
  - Formed in January 1988, to manage pension fund management.

== ANA airports ==
- Beja
- Faro (Algarve)
- Flores (Azores)
- Horta (Azores)
- Lisbon
- Ponta Delgada (Azores)
- Porto
- Santa Maria (Azores)
- Madeira
