= Ponte de Sor Aerodrome =

- IATA: QPS; ICAO: LPSO

Summary
- Airport type: Public
- Serves: Ponte de Sor, Portugal
- Coordinates: 39°12′42″N 8°03′27″W
- Website: aerodromo.cm-pontedesor.pt

Map

Runways
Direction	Length		Surface
Direction	m	ft	Surface
03/21			Asphalt

Ponte de Sor Aerodrome (IATA: QPS, ICAO: LPSO) (Aeródromo Municipal Ponte de Sor) is a municipal aerodrome serving Ponte de Sor, a town in the Portalegre District of Portugal. The aerodrome is located about 5 kilometres (3 mi) southwest of Ponte de Sor.

Based on the airfield is Sevenair Academy, the largest commercial aviation school in Europe. The school was originally operated by Gestair as G Air Training Centre. In 2017, Gestair sold the business to L3Harris, which rebranded it L3Harris Airline Academy. In 2022, L3Harris in turn sold it to Sevenair.

In 2022, an Airbus A320 airliner landed for the first time at the airport, as part of the Portugal Air Summit series of events held there. In the same year, maintenance organisation Aeromec inaugurated a new 8000 m^{2} hangar capable of containing three A320-class aircraft simultaneously. Operations at the maintenance facility started in earnest in 2024, with the arrival of the first customer A320.

In 2023, plans were announced to build a new manufacturing plant at Ponte de Sor Aerodrome for the production of Portugal's first indigenous airplane: the LUS 222 light regional aircraft.

== See also ==
- List of airports in Portugal
- Transport in Portugal
