= Sevenair Air Services =

Portuguese airline

Sevenair

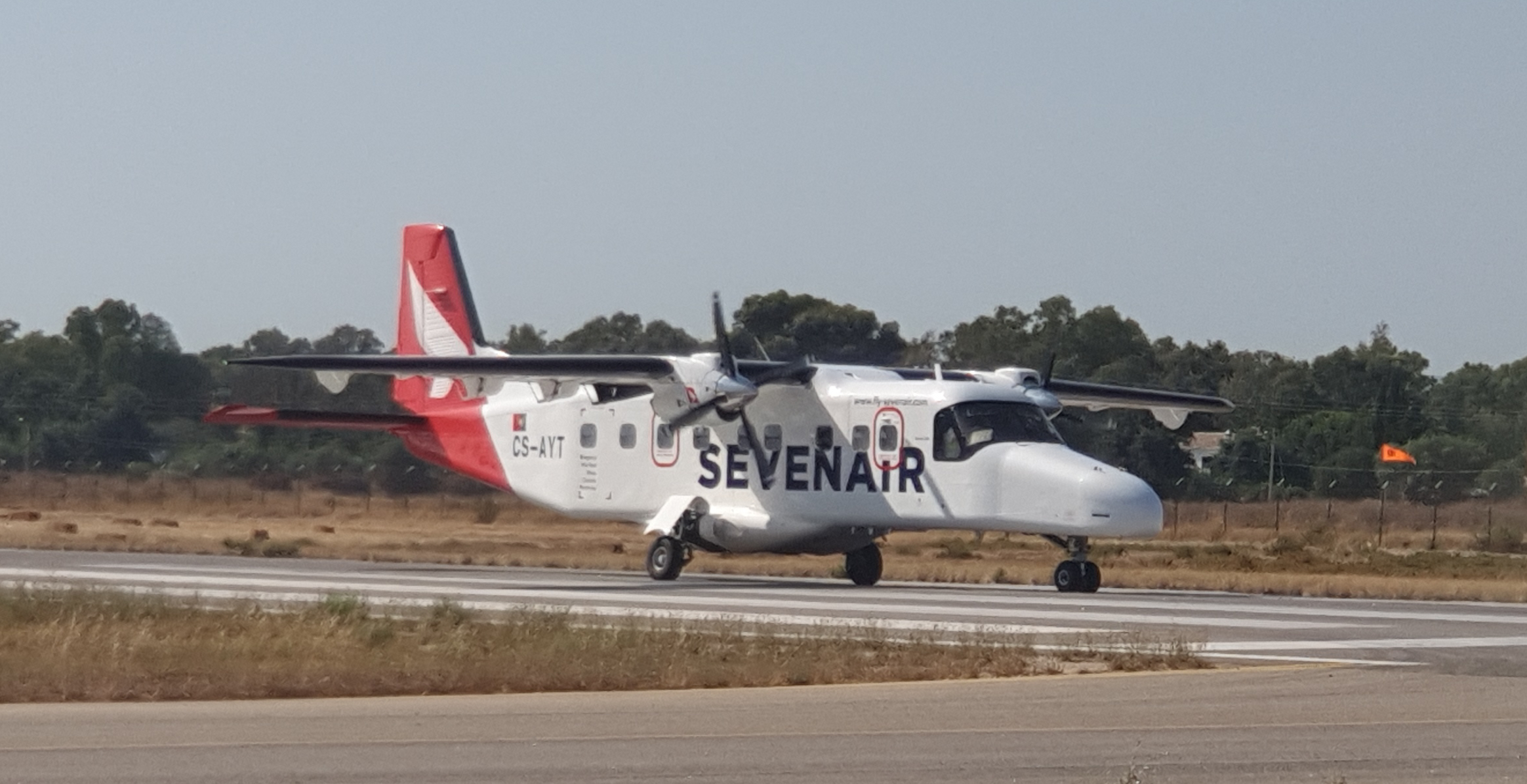
- Sevenair Dornier DO-228 CS-AYT at Portimão Airport.
IATA	ICAO	Call sign
WV	RVP	SEVAIR
- Founded: 1998; 28 years ago
- Hubs: Cascais Aerodrome.
- Secondary hubs: Portimão Aerodrome, Bragança Aerodrome.
- Fleet size: 4
- Destinations: 5
- Headquarters: Cascais, Portugal
- Website: https://www.flysevenair.com/

Sevenair SA, formerly branded Aero VIP, is a Portuguese regional airline headquartered in Cascais Aerodrome, western Lisbon. It operates domestic regional routes within mainland Portugal and also offers additional aviation services and non-scheduled operations in third countries. It is part of Sevenair Group, one of the biggest aeronautical groups operating in Portugal, which provides the following services: air transportation (regional and non-scheduled), aerial works, flying school, and aircraft maintenance.

It operates the biggest flight school in Europe, Sevenair Academy, at Ponte de Sor Aerodrome, in Portalegre District.

== History ==
Before becoming Sevenair Group, the airline was named Aero Vip, from which its IATA and ICAO codes (WV/RVP) derive.

In September 2022, Sevenair acquired all the assets of L3 Airline Academy (owned by U.S. company L3Harris) at Ponte de Sor aerodrome – including aircraft, hangars and student accommodation – integrating them into Sevenair Academy.

== Destinations ==
As of March 2019, Sevenair served the following destinations:

- Bragança
- Vila Real
- Viseu
- Lisbon–Cascais (base)
- Portimão

== Fleet ==
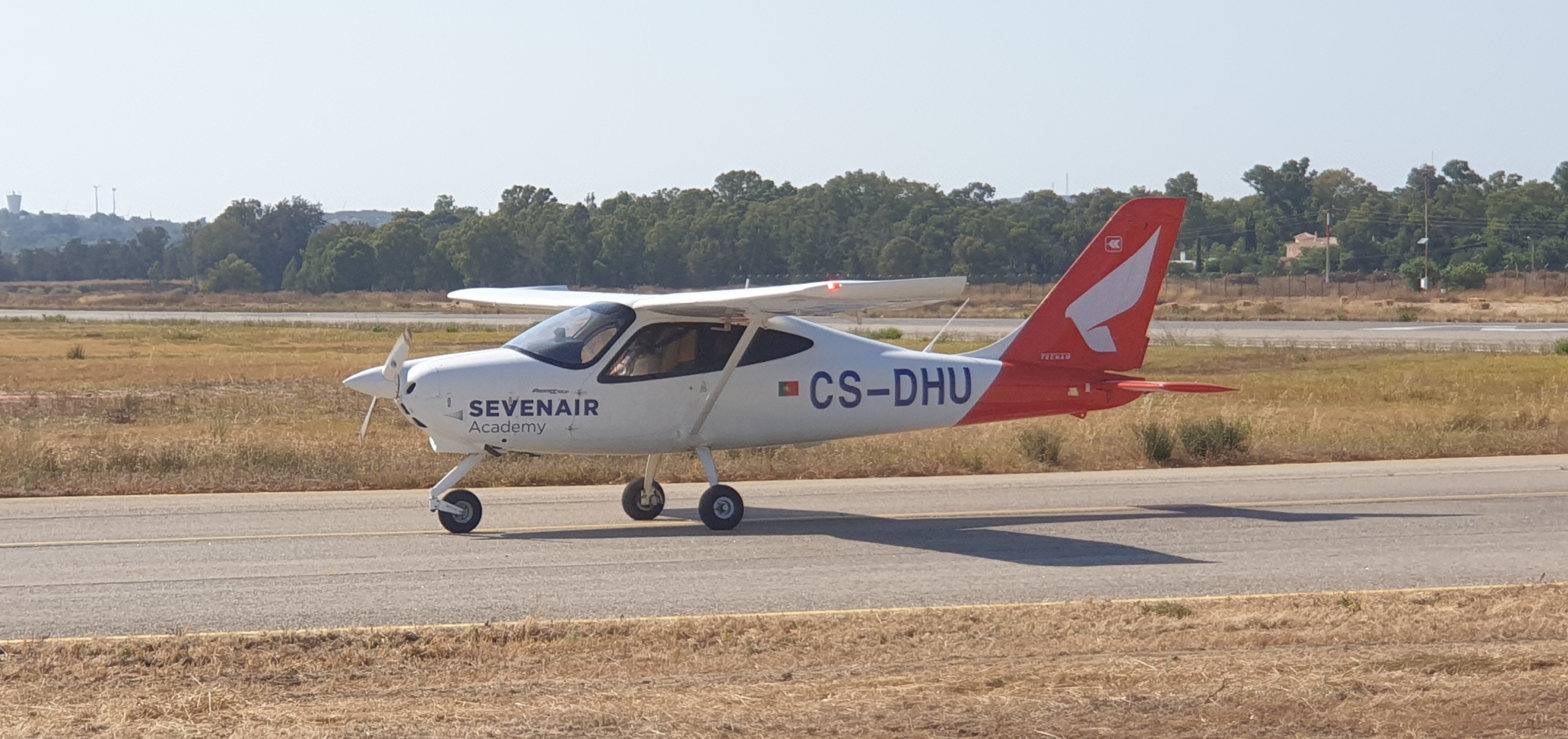
Sevenair Academy Tecnam Tecnam P2008JC CS-DHU.

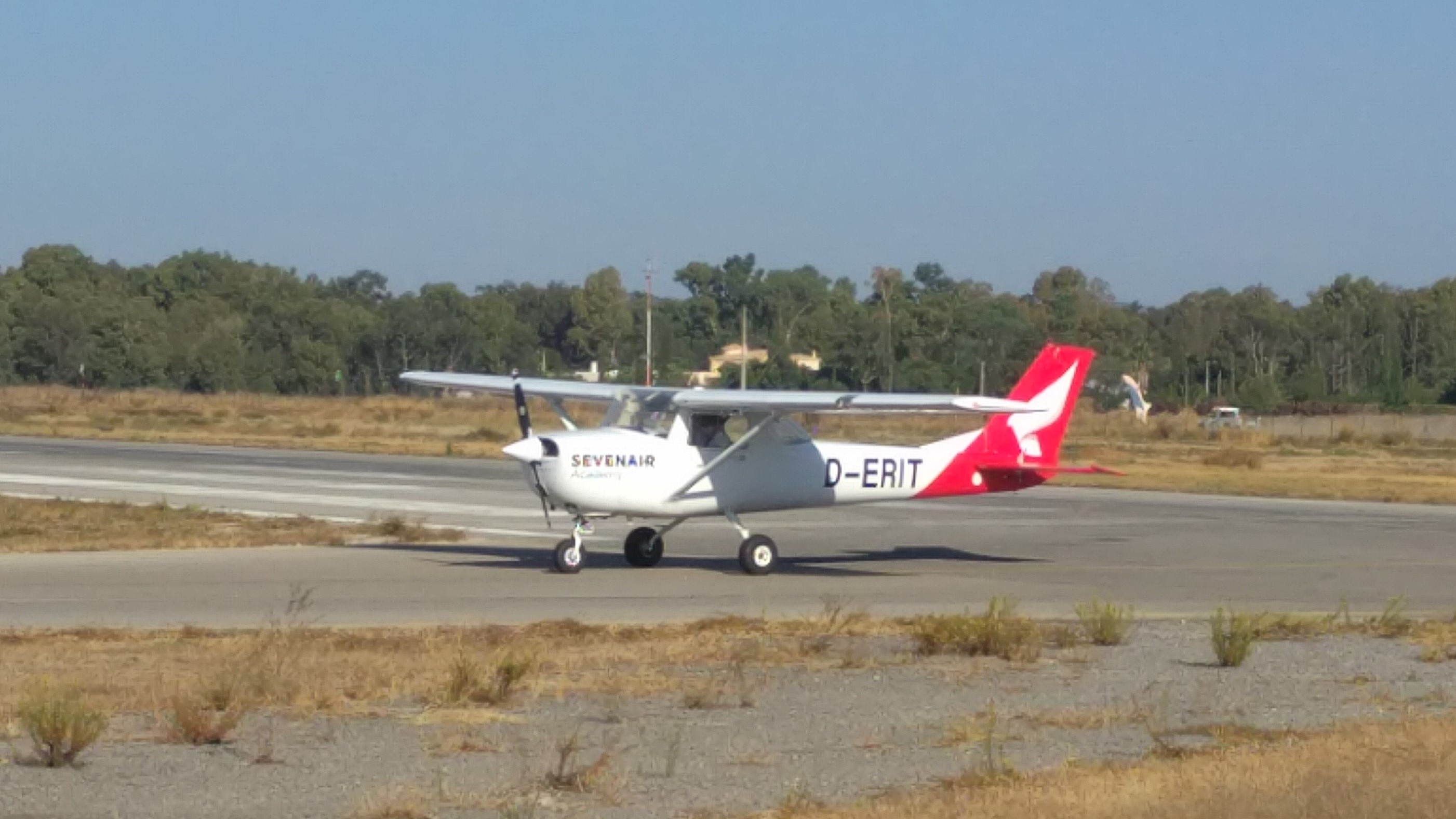
Sevenair Reims F150J D-ERIT.

As of August 2026, Sevenair operates the following aircraft:

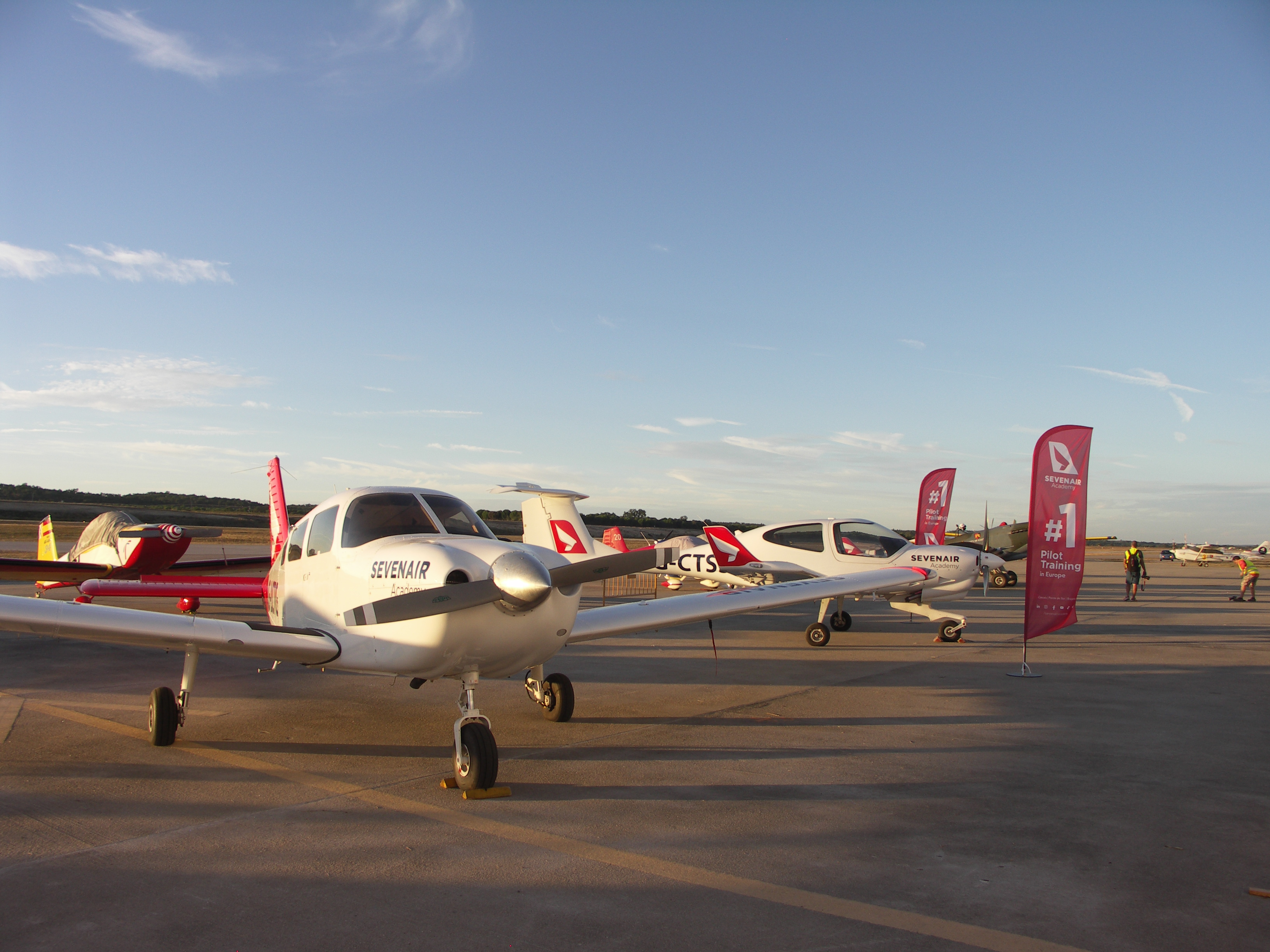
Sevenair Piper PA-28-181 Archer II and Diamond DA40 at Ponte de Sor Aerodrome

=== Airline ===
- 3 Dornier 228
- 1 Jetstream 32

=== Air services ===
- 2 Cessna 172 Rocket (used for banner towing)
- 2 Cessna 182 Skylane (used for skydiving operations)
- 2 Pilatus PC-6 (used for skydiving operations)
- 1 Piper PA-31 Chieftain (stored)
- 1 Extra EA-300

The Airline has also signed a letter of intent for 6 units of the electric Heart Aerospace ES-30 Aircraft.

== Accidents and incidents ==
On 2 December 2010, an Aero VIP Dornier 228, registration CS-TGG, flight 854 on a domestic route (Lisbon-Vila Real-Bragança), was on final approach to Braganca (LPBG) around 17:20 local time. There was snowfall and fog at the time. The airplane got too low and the nose gear cut a power line. The crew went around and landed the aircraft safely. The aircraft was not damaged and no injuries occurred. The incident left 2000 people without electricity for two hours.

In 2023, an instructor died in a Sevenair plane crash.
