= Cascais Municipal Aerodrome =

Lisboa Cascais-Tejo Regional Airport; Aeroporto Regional Lisboa Cascais-Tejo Cascais Municipal Aerodrome; Aeródromo Municipal de Cascais
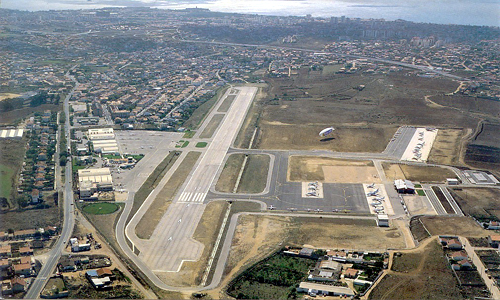
- IATA: CAT; ICAO: LPCS

Summary
- Airport type: Public
- Operator: Cascais E.M.
- Location: Tires, São Domingos de Rana, Portugal
- Elevation AMSL: 326 ft (99 m)
- Coordinates: 38°43′32″N 009°21′19″W
- Website: www.aerodromo-cascais.pt

Map
- Location in Portugal

Runways
Direction	Length		Surface
Direction	m	ft	Surface
17/35	1,700	5,577	Asphalt
- Source: Portuguese AIP

Lisbon Cascais-Tejo Regional Airport (Cascais Municipal Aerodrome), also known as Tires Aerodrome (Portuguese: Aeródromo de Tires/Aeródromo Municipal de Cascais) (IATA: CAT, ICAO: LPCS) is a regional airport, situated near the village of Tires, in the civil parish of São Domingos de Rana, in the Portuguese municipality of Cascais, approximately 12 km (7.5 mi) northeast of town of the same name in the Greater Lisbon subregion.

== History ==
On 11 October 1964, the then-President of the Portuguese Republic, Américo Tomás inaugurated the Aerodrome of Tires. The project was born of the initiatives of the Secretary-of-State for Aeronautics and Directorate-general for Civil Aeronautics, as well as the Count of Monte Real. The aerodrome was planned for the area around Areia-Guincho, but installed in Tires, a project of the Directorate and earthmoving performed by the military aeronautics division. By 1973, work on the local was still continuing.

== Airlines and destinations ==
The following airlines operate regular scheduled and charter flights at Cascais Airport:

Airlines	Destinations
Sevenair	Bragança, Portimão, Viseu, Vila Real

== Location ==
Located in Tires, on av. Amália Rodrigues, the airfield is located in the tourist area of the Estoril Coast, more precisely in São Domingos de Rana, municipality of Cascais.

== Characteristics ==
=== Frequencies and radio navigation aids ===
The aerodrome has two radio navigation aids, a locator-type NDB and a TVOR/DME.

=== Track ===
The airfield has a runway 1,400 meters long and 30 meters wide, made of asphalt concrete (PCN20) at an altitude of 326 feet. The runway is prepared to receive traffic of up to 40 tons and also has light signaling, approach lights and the Apapis system.

=== Heliport ===
The airfield also has a helipad, where an INEM (National Institute of Medical Emergency) helicopter is available 24 hours a day.

== Operators ==
This location is where many of the country's aviation schools are concentrated, as it is near the capital of Portugal and the country's largest population centre.
