= Montargil =

- Civil parish
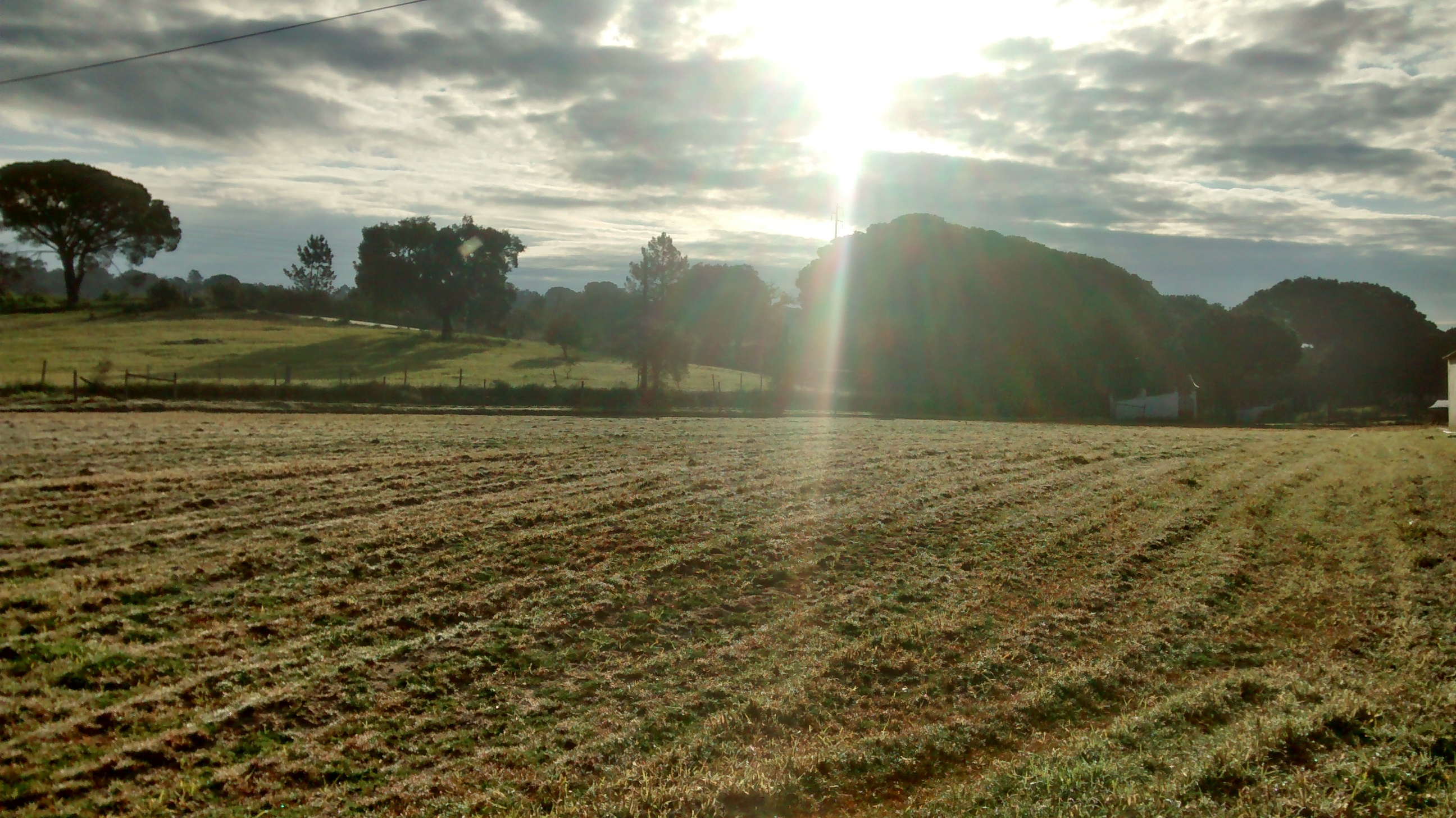

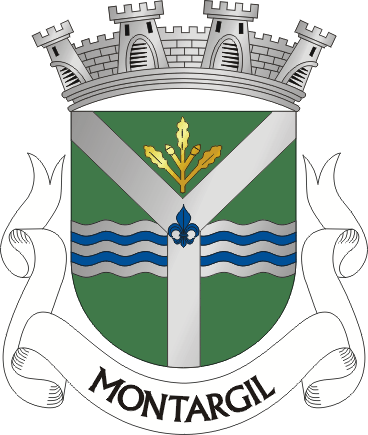
- Coat of arms

- Location in Portugal
- Coordinates: 39.079°N 8.171°W
- Country: Portugal
- Region: Alentejo
- Intermunic. comm.: Alto Alentejo
- District: Portalegre
- Municipality: Ponte de Sor

Area
  - Total: 296.94 km^{2} (114.65 sq mi)

Population (2011)
  - Total: 2,316
  - Density: 7.800/km^{2} (20.20/sq mi)
- Time zone: UTC+00:00 (WET)
  - Summer (DST): UTC+01:00 (WEST)

Montargil is a parish (freguesia) in the municipality of Ponte de Sor in Portugal. The population in 2011 was 2,316, in an area of 296.94 km^{2}.
