= Faro Airport =

International airport serving Faro, Portugal

Faro Airport Aeroporto Internacional de Faro

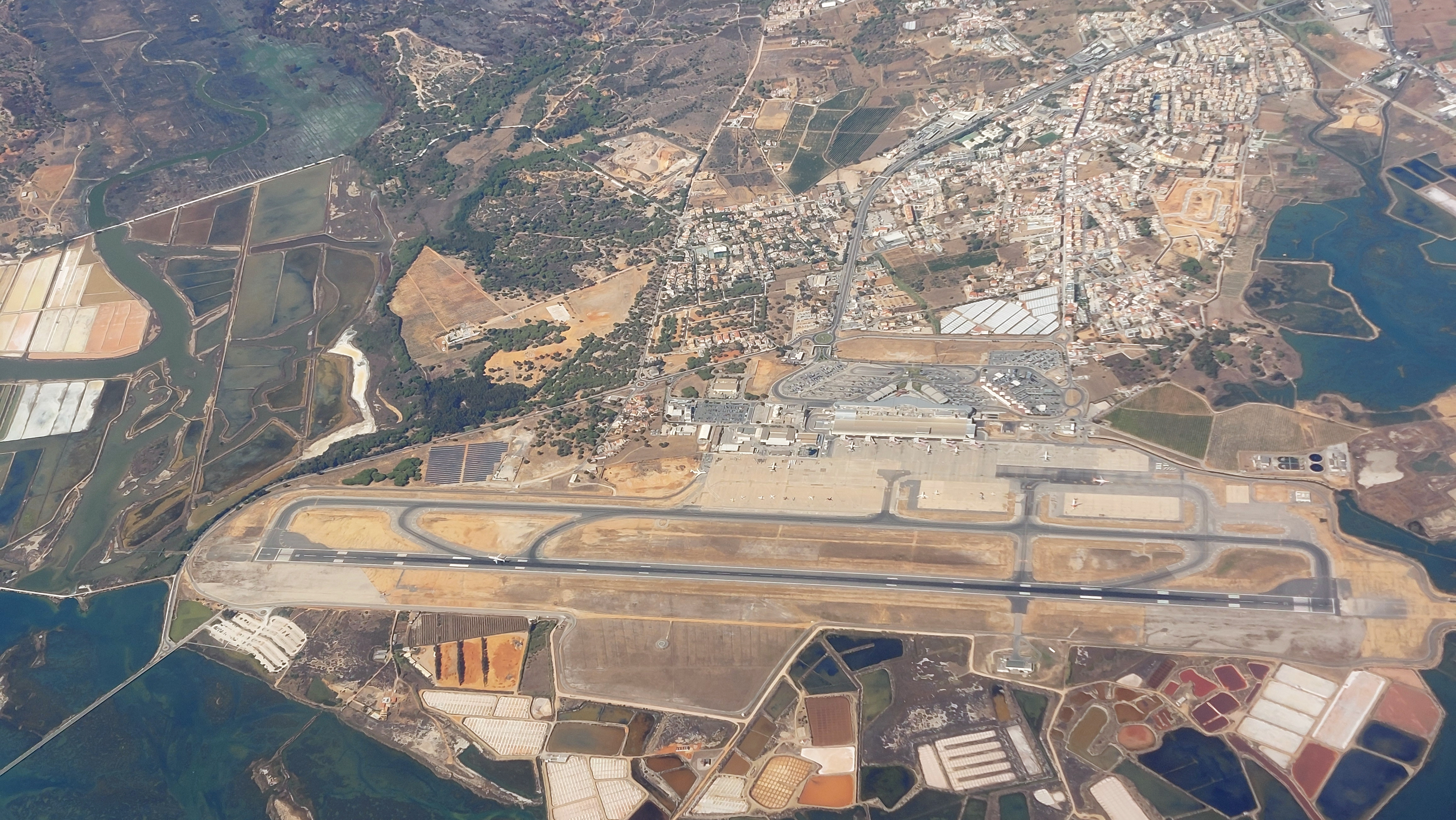
- IATA: FAO; ICAO: LPFR

Summary
- Airport type: Public
- Owner: Public operated by Vinci SA
- Operator: ANA Aeroportos de Portugal
- Serves: Faro and the wider Algarve and south western Iberian region
- Focus city for: easyJet; Ryanair
- Elevation AMSL: 7 m (23 ft)
- Coordinates: 37°00′52″N 007°57′57″W
- Website: ana.pt

Map
- Location within Portugal

Runways
Direction	Length		Surface
Direction	m	ft	Surface
10/28	2,490	8,169	Asphalt

Statistics (2025)
- Passengers: 10,395,000
- Passengers change 24-25: ▲5.8%
- Aircraft movements: 67,510
- Movements change 24-25: ▲6.3%
- Sources: ANAC, Vinci, ANA, WAD

Faro International Airport (Portuguese: Aeroporto de Faro, IATA: FAO, ICAO: LPFR), officially Faro - Gago Coutinho International Airport (Aeroporto Internacional de Faro - Gago Coutinho), is an international airport located 4 kilometres (2 miles) west of the city of Faro in Portugal. The airport opened in July 1965 being the main gateway to Faro District (the year-round resort region of the Algarve) and southwestern Spain, with more than 10 million passengers using the facility in 2025. Since 2022, it is named after Gago Coutinho, Portuguese geographer, cartographer, naval officer, historian and aviation pioneer.

== History ==
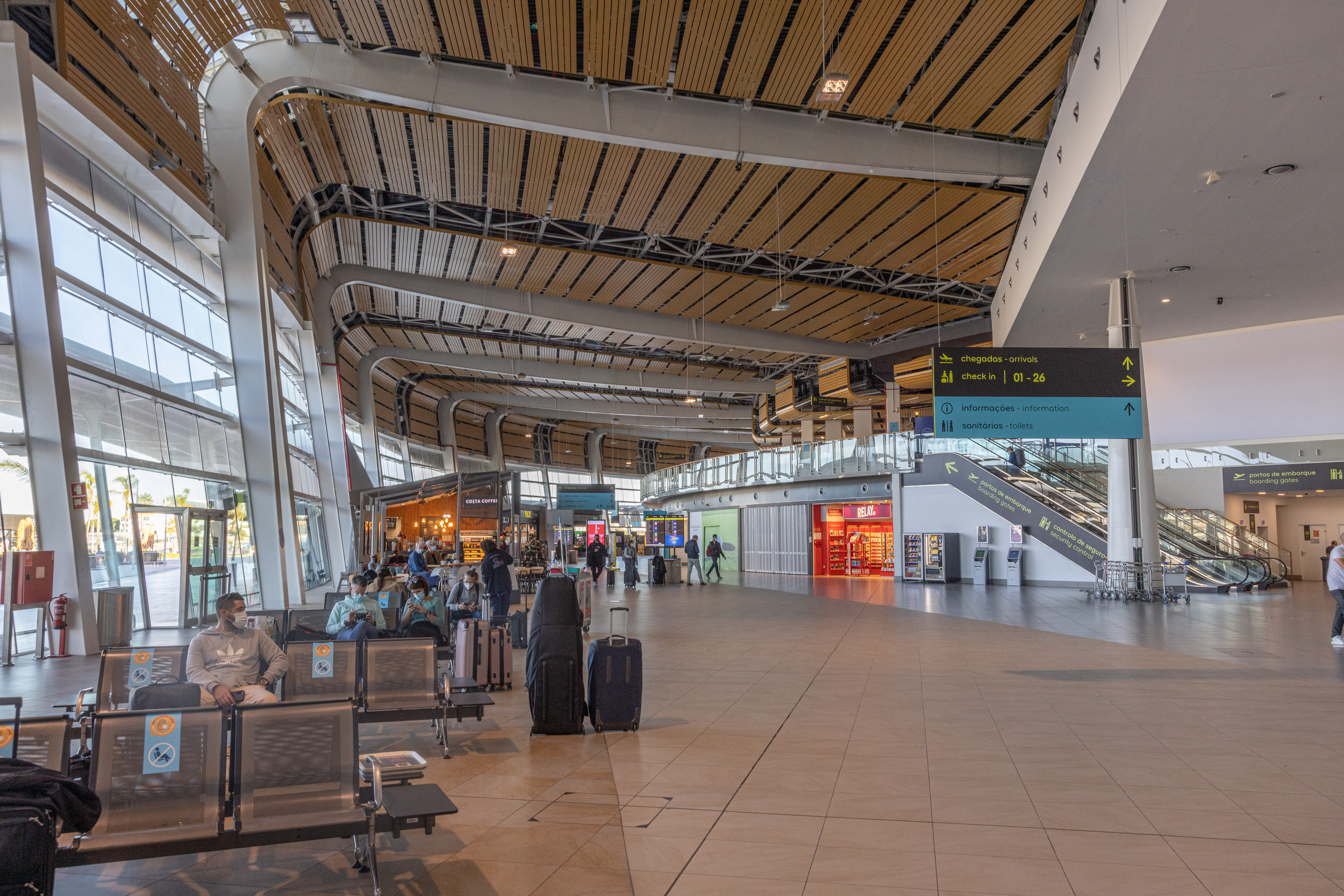
Arrivals area

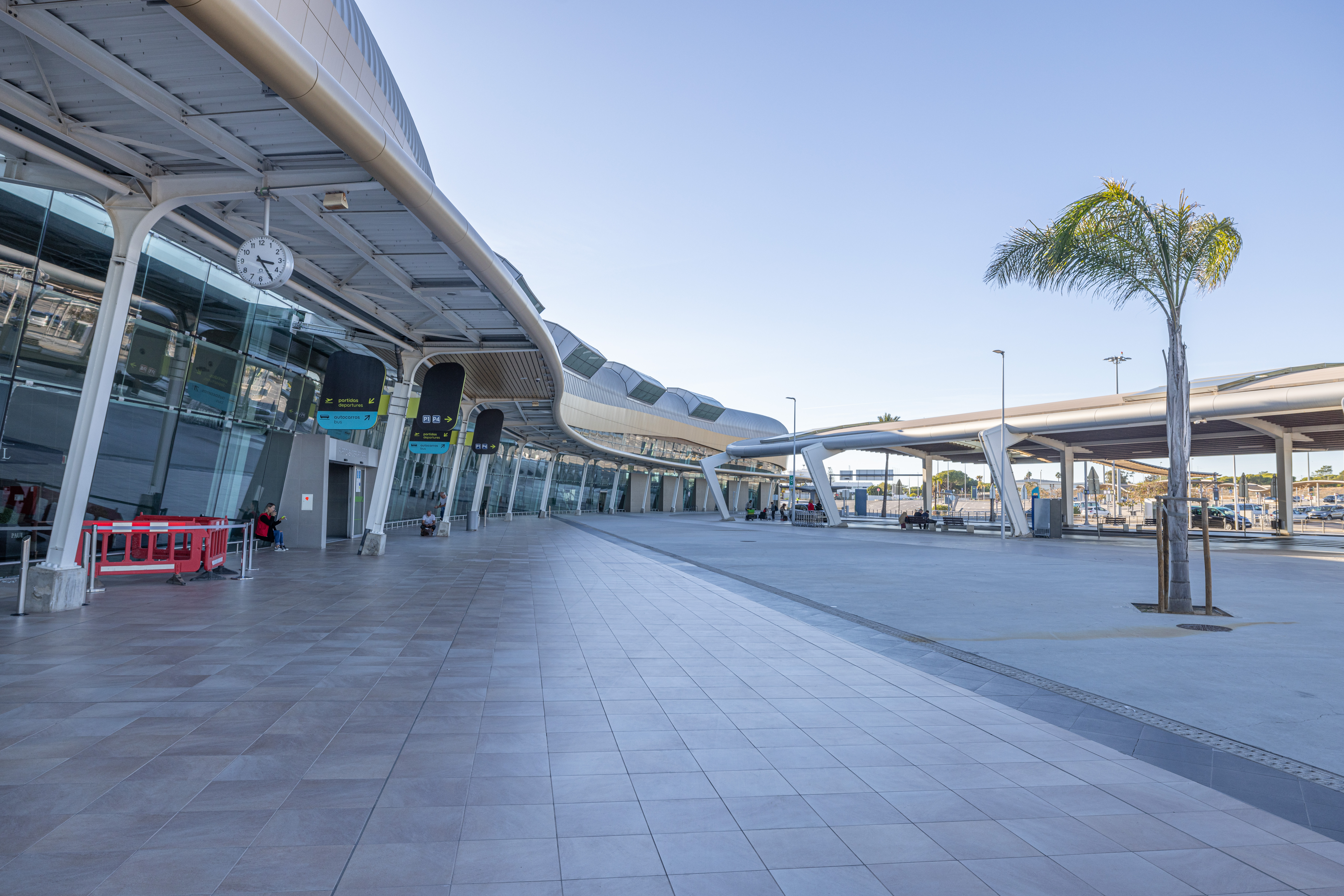
Terminal building

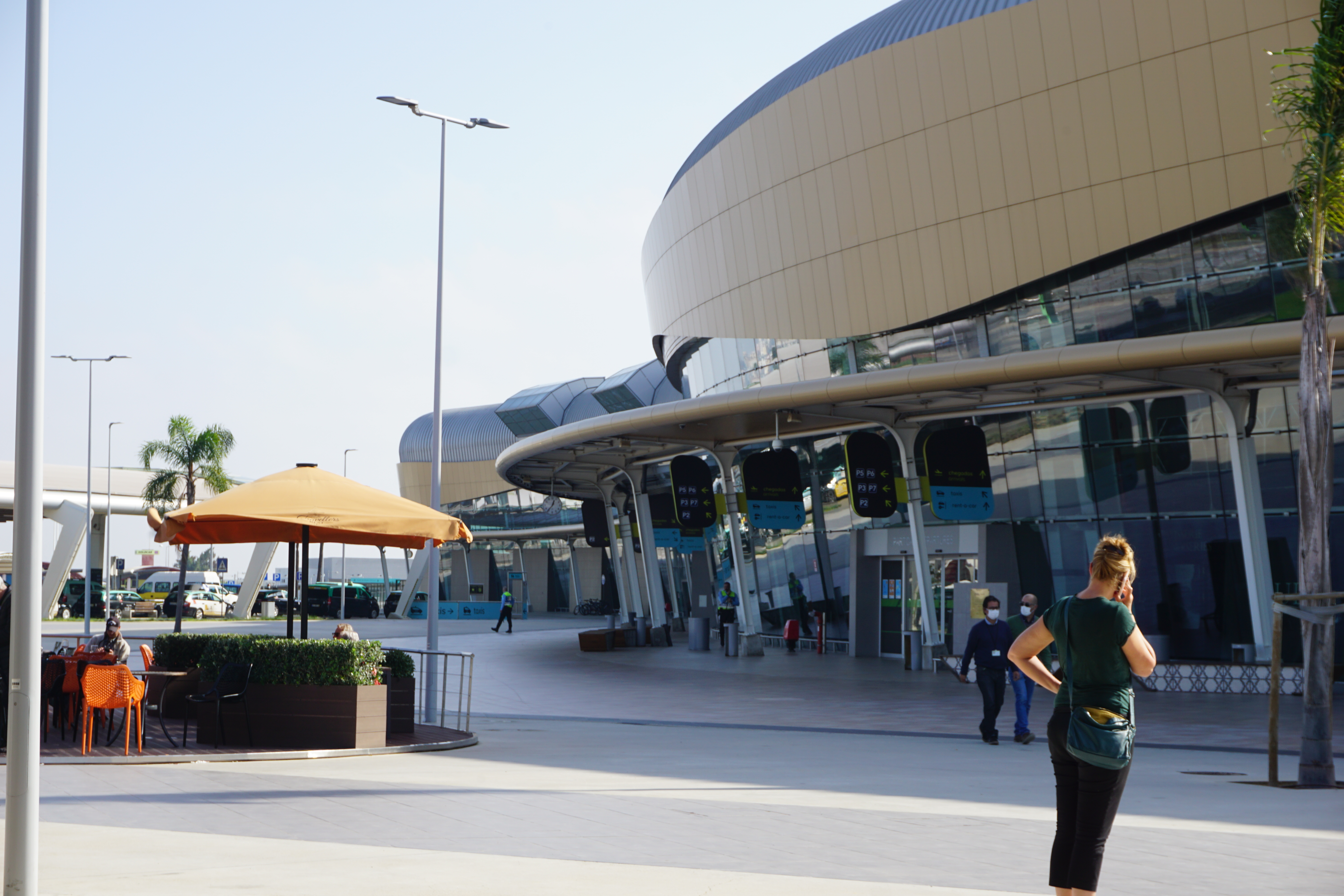
Terminal building

Faro International Airport is located 4 km from Faro, the capital city of Algarve in Portugal. Situated in the southern coast of Portugal, the airport was constructed during the 1960s and inaugurated in 1965. The Portuguese Government is the owner of Faro airport, although, in the 2010s, the administration was granted to Vinci Group, company winning the privatization of the Portuguese airports operator - ANA Aeroportos de Portugal - which has been its operator. Along with the airports in Lisbon, Porto, Ponta Delgada, Santa Maria, Horta, Flores, Madeira, and Porto Santo, the airport's concessions to provide support to civil aviation were conceded to ANA Aeroportos de Portugal on 18 December 1998, under provisions of decree 404/98. With this concession, ANA became responsible for the planning, development and construction of future infrastructure.

Since its opening in 1966 to the 2000s, Faro airport has had two major developments: the new passenger terminal building in 1989, and its enlargement in 2001. Faced with growing traffic demand and passenger safety and satisfaction needs, the development plan for 2009–2013 saw Faro airport undergo extensive improvements to runway and infrastructure, as well as a widespread renovation of the airport terminal and commercial areas. The airport authority announced an expansion programme for Faro airport in February 2010. Phase I of the expansion started in 2010 and was completed by 2011. Phase II began in 2011 and was completed by 2013. Faro International Airport handled 5,447,200 passengers and recorded 39,789 aircraft movements in 2008. When the Phase II expansion was completed, the annual capacity of the airport increased from six million to eight million passengers. Passengers handled per hour increased to 3,000, the number of aircraft handled per hour increased to 30, and aircraft parking bays increased from 22 to 33. Additional shops and waiting areas were constructed as part of the expansion. In Phase I, new aircraft stands and taxiways were planned to be constructed. A new instrument landing system (ILS) was installed at the runway along with the installation of a glide reflection mirror. The security area at the runway was also expanded. Phase II involved the renovation of the passenger terminal and the improvement of the landside access.

As of 2019, Faro Airport is capable of handling nine million passengers a year. There are 22 stands, of which 16 are remote, with 60 check-in desks and 36 boarding gates.

In June 2022, it was announced that the airport would carry Gago Coutinho's name in honour of the navigator and admiral of Algarve origins who, in 1922, together with the aviator Sacadura Cabral, accomplished the first aerial crossing of the South Atlantic in the seaplane Lusitânia, named after the Roman Empire name for what would become Portugal. The airport name became official in September 2022. At the same time it was announced the commissioning of a solar power plant with a capacity of 3MWp, enabling to produce 30% of the airport's electricity needs, reducing CO_{2} emissions by more than 1,500 tonnes per year.

== Airlines and destinations ==
The following airlines operate regular scheduled direct passenger flights at Faro Airport:

Airlines	Destinations
Aer Lingus	Cork, Dublin
Air France	Seasonal: Paris–Charles de Gaulle
Air Transat	Toronto–Pearson; Seasonal: Montréal–Trudeau (begins 15 June 2027)
airBaltic	Riga
Animawings	Seasonal: Bucharest–Otopeni
Azores Airlines	Ponta Delgada
British Airways	London–Gatwick; Seasonal: London–City, London–Heathrow; Seasonal charter: Derry, Guernsey, Isle of Man
Brussels Airlines	Brussels
Condor	Seasonal: Frankfurt, Hamburg, Munich
easyJet	Amsterdam, Basel/Mulhouse, Belfast–International, Birmingham, Bristol, Geneva, Glasgow, Liverpool, London–Gatwick, London–Luton, Lyon, Manchester, Nantes, Paris–Orly; Seasonal: Bordeaux, London–Southend, Newcastle upon Tyne, Southampton
Edelweiss Air	Zürich
Enter Air	Gdańsk
Eurowings	Berlin, Cologne/Bonn, Düsseldorf, Hamburg, Stuttgart; Seasonal: Hannover
Finnair	Helsinki
Iberia	Seasonal: Madrid
Icelandair	Seasonal: Reykjavík–Keflavík
Jet2.com	Birmingham, Bristol, East Midlands, Liverpool, London–Gatwick, Seasonal: Belfast–International, Bournemouth
LOT	Warsaw
Lufthansa	Frankfurt, Munich
Lufthansa City Airlines	Munich
Luxair	Luxembourg
Marabu	Seasonal: Hamburg
Norwegian Air Shuttle	Copenhagen, Oslo, Stockholm–Arlanda
Ryanair	Belfast-International, Berlin, (ends 24 October 2026), Birmingham, Bournemouth, Bristol, Brussels Charleroi, Cork, Dublin, East Midlands, Edinburgh, Eindhoven, Frankfurt Hahn, Karlsruhe/Baden-Baden, Kraków, Leeds/Bradford, Liverpool, London–Luton, London–Stansted, Manchester, Marrakesh, Memmingen, Milan Bergamo, Newcastle upon Tyne, Nuremberg, Paris Beauvais, Porto (ends 24 October 2026), Vienna, Warsaw–Modlin, Weeze; Seasonal: Aberdeen, Barcelona, Cardiff, Cologne/Bonn, Copenhagen, Exeter, Glasgow–Prestwick, Kerry, Knock, Luxembourg, Madrid, Marseille, Newquay, Norwich, Rome–Fiumicino, Shannon, Teesside, Toulouse, Warsaw
Scandinavian Airlines	Copenhagen, Stockholm–Arlanda; Seasonal: Gothenburg, Oslo
Smartwings	Warsaw
Swiss International Air Lines	Seasonal: Geneva
TAP Air Portugal	Funchal, Lisbon
Transavia	Amsterdam, Brussels, Eindhoven, Paris–Orly, Rotterdam; Seasonal: Lyon, Nantes, Nice
TUI Airways	Seasonal: Cardiff, East Midlands
TUI fly Belgium	Seasonal: Brussels
TUI fly Deutschland	Seasonal: Düsseldorf, Frankfurt, Hannover, Stuttgart
United Airlines	Seasonal: Newark
Volotea	Seasonal: Brest, Lille, Lyon, Nantes, Strasbourg
Vueling	Seasonal: Bilbao
Wizz Air	London–Gatwick, London–Luton; Seasonal: Bucharest–Otopeni, Katowice, Warsaw–Chopin

== Statistics ==
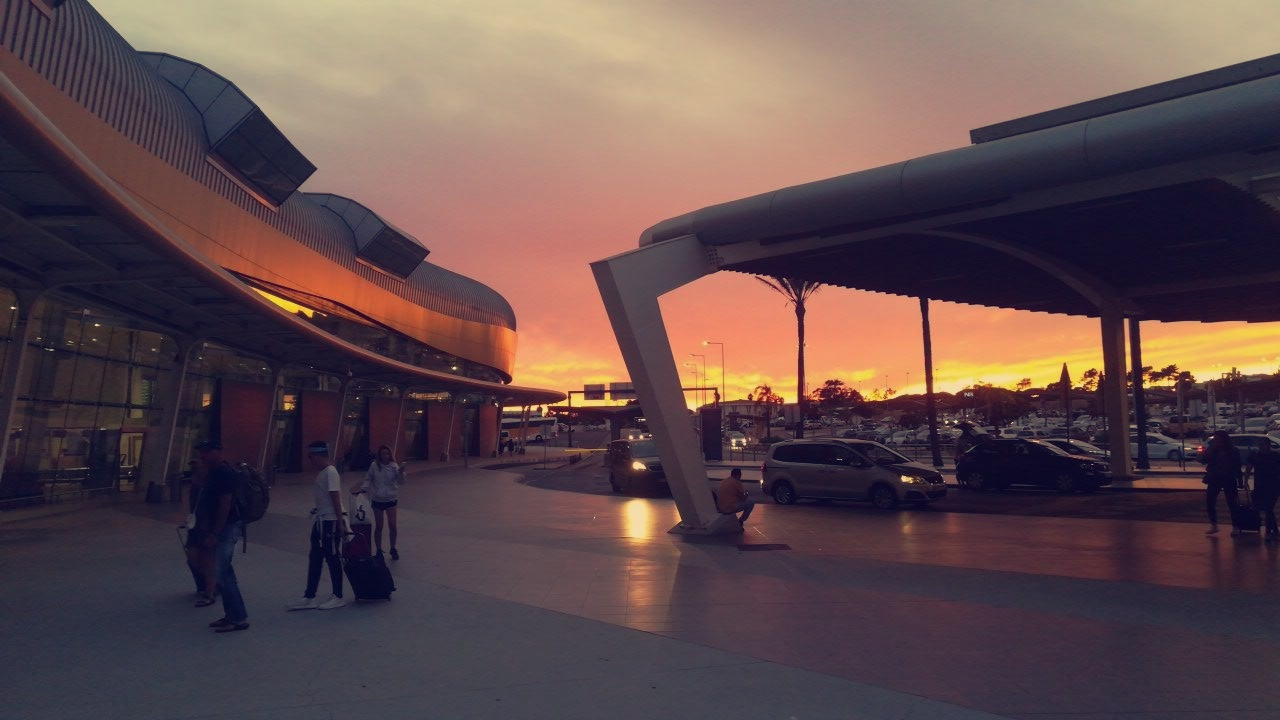
Faro airport exterior at sunset

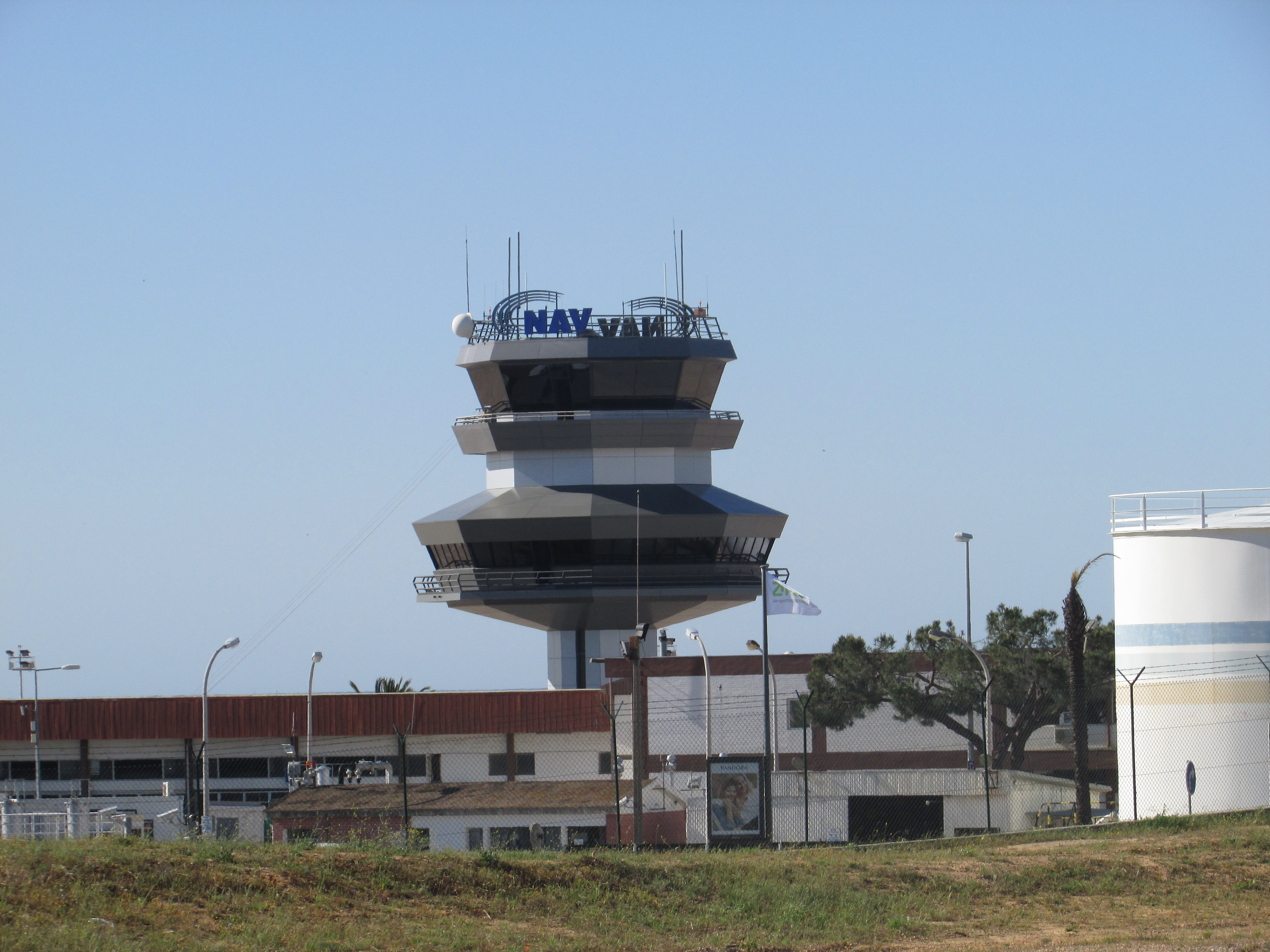
ATC tower

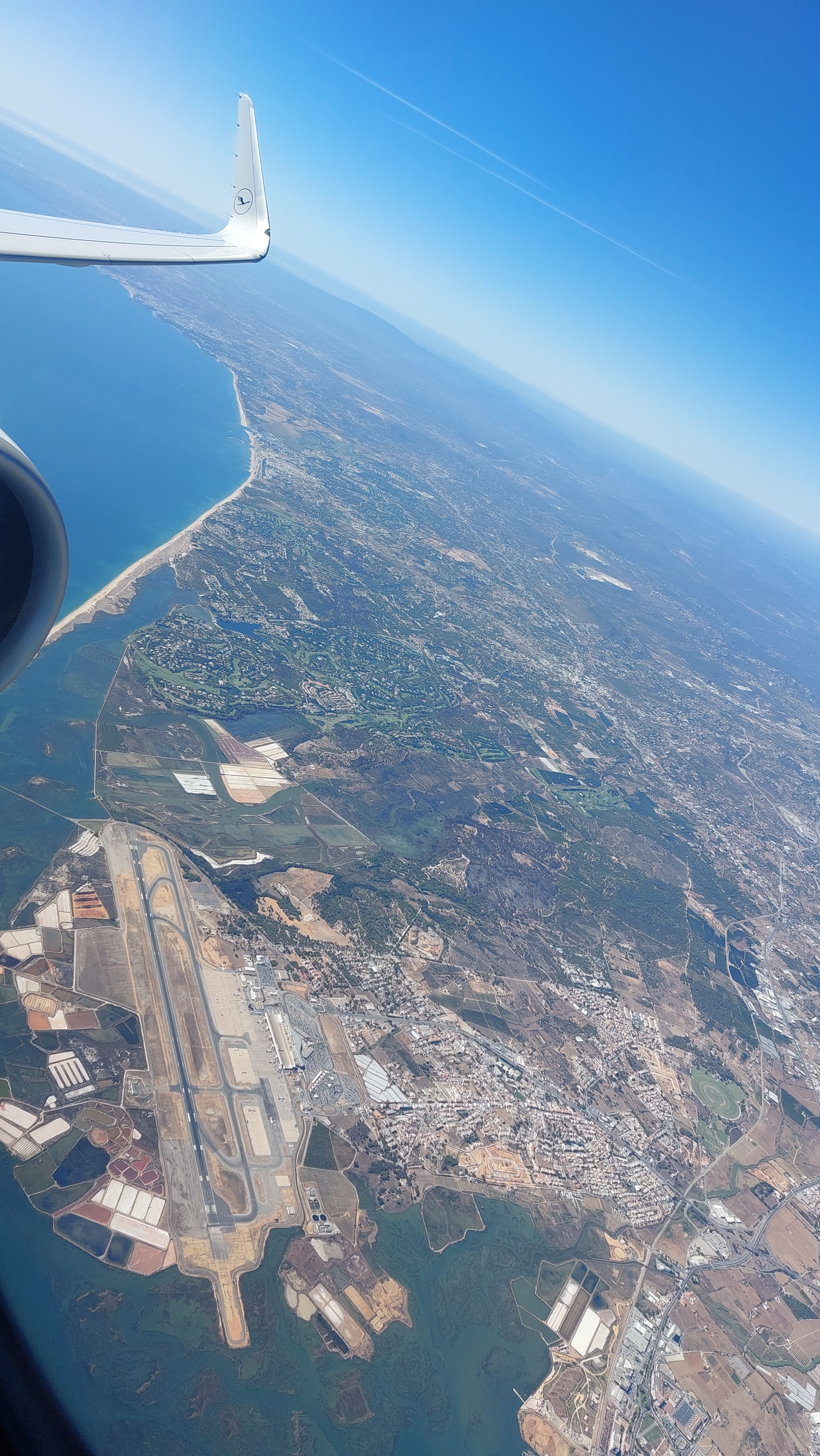
Faro airport from above.

=== Passenger numbers ===
Year	Passengers	% Change
1990	2,757,749	
1991	3,323,867	▲20.5%
1992	3,366,542	▲1.3%
1993	3,062,702	▼9.0%
1994	3,508,520	▲14.6%
1995	3,831,470	▲9.2%
1996	3,657,457	▼4.5%
1997	3,825,029	▲4.6%
1998	4,102,433	▲7.3%
1999	4,523,654	▲10.3%
2000	4,704,780	▲4.0%
2001	4,579,459	▼2.7%
2002	4,706,432	▲2.8%
2003	4,696,100	▼0.2%
2004	4,658,189	▼0.8%
2005	4,754,508	▲2.1%
2006	5,089,733	▲7.1%
2007	5,470,712	▲7.5%
2008	5,447,200	▼0.4%
2009	5,062,214	▼7.1%
2010	5,337,542	▲5.4%
2011	5,617,688	▲5.2%
2012	5,674,221	▲1.0%
2013	5,982,950	▲5.4%
2014	6,168,868	▲3.1%
2015	6,439,480	▲4.9%
2016	7,632,857	▲18.5%
2017	8,728,876	▲14.4%
2018	8,687,064	▼0.5%
2019	9,010,860	▲3.7%
2020	2,208,276	▼75.5%
2021	3,265,182	▲47.9%
2022	8,170,715	▲150.2%
2023	9,640,068	▲18.0%
2024	9,829,497	▲2.0%
2025	10,395,000	▲5.8%
Jan–Sep 2026	8,788,000	▲3.7%
Source: Pordata Vinci INE

=== Busiest routes ===
Top 10 busiest routes from Faro in 2024
Rank	Airport	Passengers	Airlines
1	London-Gatwick	854,228	British Airways, easyJet, TUI Airways, Wizz Air
2	Dublin	665,887	Aer Lingus, Ryanair
3	Manchester	478,657	easyJet, Jet2.com, Ryanair, TUI Airways
4	London–Stansted	406,011	Jet2.com, Ryanair
5	Bristol	379,313	easyJet, Jet2.com, Ryanair
6	London–Luton	294,340	easyJet, Ryanair
7	Paris–Orly	291,995	easyJet, Transavia
8	Lisbon	279,125	TAP Air Portugal
9	Amsterdam	277,445	easyJet
10	Birmingham	263,745	easyJet, Jet2.com, Ryanair, TUI Airways

== Ground transport ==
=== Car ===
The airport is close to the A22 highway, with connections throughout the Algarve and direct to Lisbon and Spain.

=== Bus ===
Airport bus routes 14 and 16 run each day between Faro Airport and Faro city centre bus station. From the bus station there are connections to most other Portuguese cities as well as to many Spanish destinations. The airport bus route is currently run by a company called "Proximo".

=== Railway ===
The nearest railway station is Faro, which is about 5.7 kilometres (3.5 mi) away and is located close to Faro city centre bus station. A study into a rail link to the airport was undertaken in 2018.

== Accidents and incidents ==
- On 21 December 1992, Martinair Flight 495 crash landed in bad weather at Faro Airport, killing 54 passengers and 2 crew out of a total of 340 occupants on board.

== See also ==
- Transport in Portugal
- List of airports in Portugal
