= Transport in Portugal =

Transport in Portugal is diversified. Portugal has a 68,732 km (42,708 mi) network of roads, of which almost 3,000 km (1,864 mi) are part of a 44 motorways system. Brisa is the largest highway management concessionaire. With 89,015 km^{2}, Continental Portugal has 4 international airports located near Lisbon, Porto, Faro and Beja. The national railway system service is provided by Comboios de Portugal. The major seaports are located in Leixões, Aveiro, Figueira da Foz, Lisbon, Setúbal, Sines and Faro.

== Roads ==
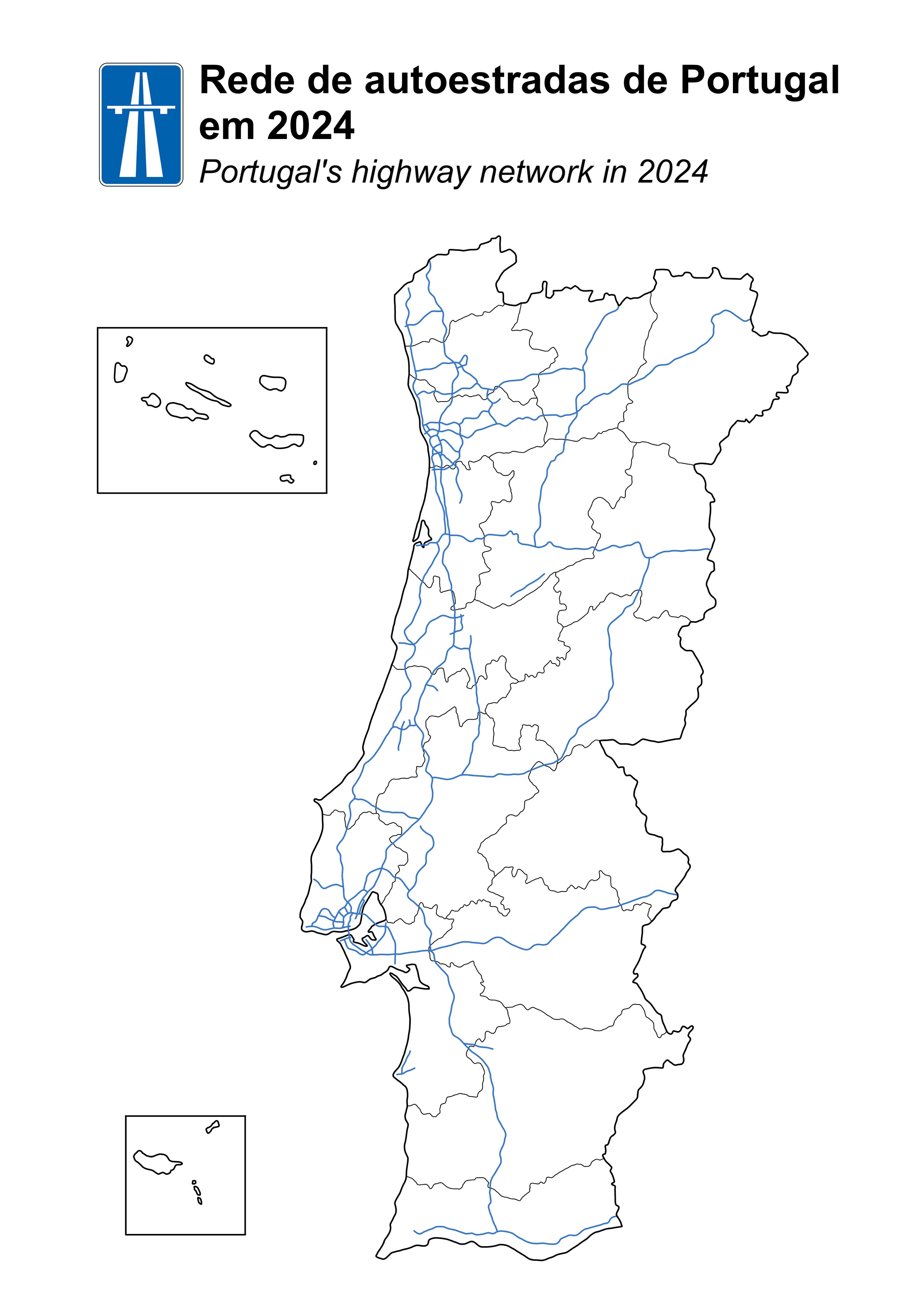
Motorway network map by 2024.

In 1972, Brisa was to construct 390 km (242 mi) of roadways by the end of 1981. The first priority was a highway designated as A1, a 300 km (186 mi) stretch reaching from the capital of Lisbon north to Porto, Portugal's second-largest city. This highway would become a crucial link to the industrial activity in the north of the country and experience the highest traffic volumes in Brisa's network. Construction also began on the A2, which was projected to reach from Lisbon to resort areas on the southern coast.

Two years after the establishment of Brisa, the right wing dictatorship was overthrown by a leftist revolution. The new regime included Brisa in a program of nationalization, first taking control of 40 percent of the company and eventually gaining a 90 percent share. Road construction continued stretch by stretch under socialist control. As the first highway sections were completed on the A1 and A2, the government concession was expanded to include adjoining stretches. In addition, concessions were granted for expansions to the network: the A3 would extend the north–south highway from Porto up to the Spanish border, the A4 would reach east from Porto to the city of Amarante, and the A5 was to reach from Lisbon about 25 mi (40 km) west to the coast. However, during the first years of democratic government, the combined length of the network never exceeded 300 km (186 mi) through the 1980s. Transportation was seen as a priority in the 1990s, pushed by the growing use of automobiles and mass consumption.

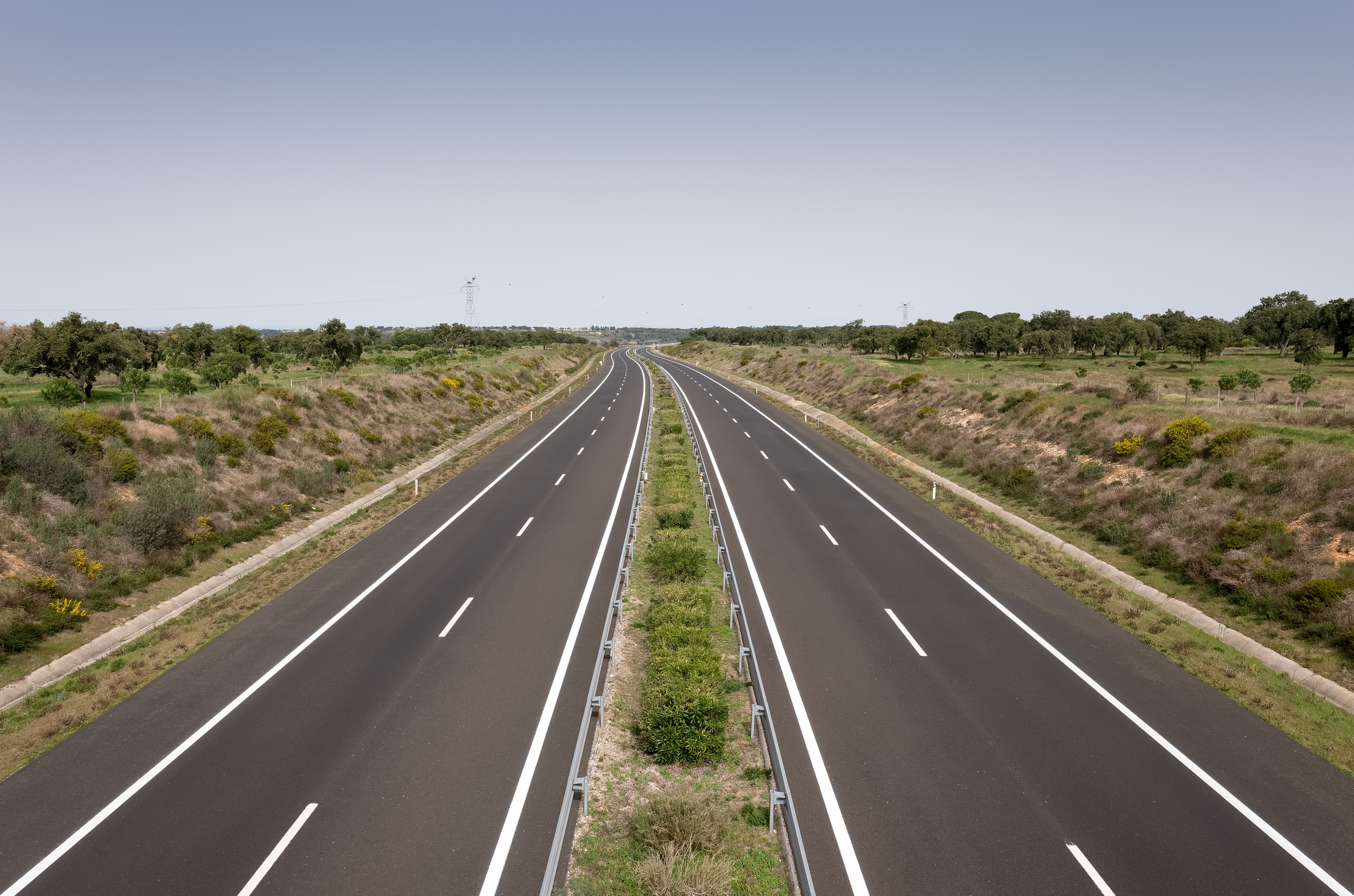
In the 1990s many motorways were opened. Shown is the A13 motorway

In 1985, a new government led by the center-right Social Democrats headed by Prime Minister Aníbal Cavaco Silva, came to power in Portugal and began loosening the state's control over economic activity. After years of slow progress, the government began an extensive investment program to bring the transportation infrastructure up to date. While some funds were earmarked for railroad and subway companies, the largest share went to highways. Brisa received a direct capital injection of PTE 17.7 billion in 1990. The investment was urgently needed, since traffic volume in Portugal was growing at a faster rate than any other country in the European Union. Average daily traffic volume increased at a rate about 4.5 percent more than the gross domestic product each year between 1990 and 1996. The government kept up its intensive program of annual investments, allowing Brisa's network to grow from 300 km (186 mi) in 1990 to 600 km (373 mi) in 1995.

== Railways ==
=== National rail system ===
The principal train operator in Portugal is Comboios de Portugal. Rail infrastructure is maintained by Infraestruturas de Portugal.

=== Urban mass transit ===
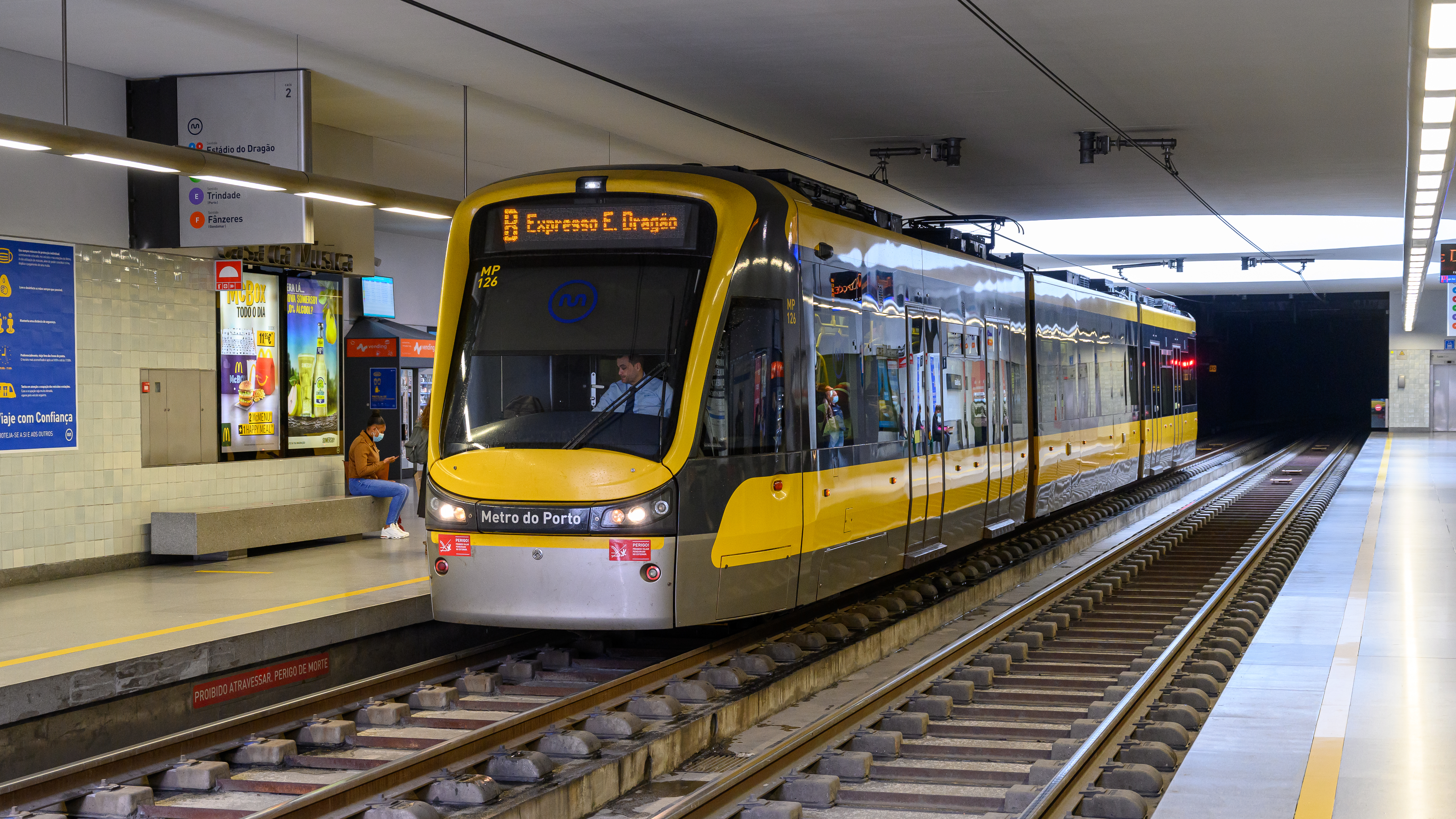
Porto Metro light rail.

The two largest metropolitan areas have subway systems: Lisbon Metro and Metro Transportes do Sul in the Lisbon metropolitan area and Porto Metro in the Porto Metropolitan Area, each with more than 35 km (22 mi) of lines. In Portugal, Lisbon tram services have been supplied by the Companhia de Carris de Ferro de Lisboa (Carris), for over a century. In Porto, a tram network, of three lines, began construction on 12 September 1895, the first in the Iberian Peninsula.

All major cities and towns have their own local urban bus transport network, as well as taxi services.

== Airports ==
Lisbon's geographical position makes it a stopover point for many foreign airlines at airports all over the country. The government decided to build a new airport outside Lisbon, in Montijo, to replace Lisbon Portela Airport. Currently, the most important airports are in Lisbon, Porto, Faro, Funchal (Madeira) and Ponta Delgada (Azores). The national airline is TAP Air Portugal.

== See also ==
- Comboios de Portugal, the state passenger rail service in Portugal
- List of ships of the Portuguese Navy
- Rede Nacional de Expressos (express buses)
