= List of the busiest airports in Portugal =

== Portugal's busiest airports by passenger traffic ==
=== 2013 ===
Rank	Airport	IATA	City	Total passengers	Annual change	Total movements	Annual change
1	Lisbon Airport	LIS	Lisbon	16,008,848	▲4,6%	142,333	▲1,0%
2	Porto Airport	OPO	Porto	6,372,801	▲5,3%	58,384	▲1,0%
3	Faro Airport	FAO	Faro	5,981,448	▲5,4%	41,410	▲5,0%
4	Cristiano Ronaldo International Airport	FNC	Madeira	2,469,413	▲7,1%	23,109	▲1,9%
5	Ponta Delgada Airport	PDL	Ponta Delgada	918,072	▲3,4%	5,689	▼1,9%

=== 2014 ===
Rank	Airport	IATA	City	Total passengers	Annual change	Total movements	Annual change
1	Lisbon Airport	LIS	Lisbon	18,142,035	▲13,3%	152,335	▲7,0%
2	Porto Airport	OPO	Porto	6,930,270	▲8,8%	62,165	▲6,5%
3	Faro Airport	FAO	Faro	6,166,927	▲3,1%	42,402	▲2,4%
4	Cristiano Ronaldo International Airport	FNC	Madeira	2,567,419	▲4,0%	24,296	▲5,1%
5	Ponta Delgada Airport	PDL	Ponta Delgada	978,263	▲6,6%	5,843	▲2,7%

=== 2015 ===
Rank	Airport	IATA	City	Total passengers	Annual change	Total movements	Annual change
1	Lisbon Airport	LIS	Lisbon	20,090,418	▲10,7%	162,042	▲6,4%
2	Porto Airport	OPO	Porto	8,087,740	▲16,7%	69,377	▲11,6%
3	Faro Airport	FAO	Faro	6,436,881	▲4,4%	43,096	▲1,6%
4	Cristiano Ronaldo International Airport	FNC	Madeira	2,728,229	▲6,3%	24,417	▲0,5%
5	Ponta Delgada Airport	PDL	Ponta Delgada	1,265,792	▲29,4%	6,724	▲15,1%

=== 2016 ===
Rank	Airport	IATA	Region	Total passengers	Annual change	Total movements	Annual change
1	Lisbon Airport	LIS	Lisbon	22,449,289	▲11,7%	178,639	▲10,2%
2	Porto Airport	OPO	Porto	9,378,082	▲16,0%	77,361	▲11,6%
3	Faro Airport	FAO	Faro	7,630,909	▲4,4%	51,330	▲1,6%
4	Madeira Airport	FNC	Madeira	2,969,785	▲14,6%	27,338	▲12,0%
5	Ponta Delgada Airport	PDL	Azores	1,515,749	▲17,9%	24,279	▲13,3%
6	Terceira Airport	TER	Azores	520,203	▲14,6%	2,400	▲12,0%
7	Horta Airport	HOR	Azores	197,429	▲14,6%	3,227	▲12,0%
8	Porto Santo Airport	PXO	Madeira	156,120	▲14,6%	3,227	▲12,0%
9	Santa Maria Airport	SMA	Azores	93,436	▲14,6%	3,176	▲12,0%
10	Flores Airport	FLW	Azores	55,264	▲14,6%	738	▲12,0%
11	Pico Airport	PIX	Azores	TBC	▲14,6%	738	▲12,0%
12	Sao Jorge Airport	SJZ	Azores	TBC	▲14,6%	738	▲12,0%
13	Graciosa Airport	GRW	Azores	TBC	▲14,6%	738	▲12,0%
14	Corvo Airport	CVU	Azores	7,107	▲14,6%	288	▲12,0%

=== 2017 ===
Rank	Airport	IATA	Region	Total passengers	Annual change	Total movements	Annual change
1	Lisbon Airport	LIS	Lisbon	26,660,000	▲18.8%	tbc	▲10,2%
2	Porto Airport	OPO	Porto	10,787,000	▲15,0%	tbc	▲11,6%
3	Faro Airport	FAO	Faro	8,727,000	▲14,4%	tbc	▲1,6%
4	Madeira Airport	FNC	Madeira	3,377,000	▲7,9%	tbc	▲12,0%
5	Ponta Delgada Airport	PDL	Azores	1,849,000	▲9%	tbc	▲13,3%
6	Terceira Airport	TER	Azores	579,747	▲14,6%	tbc	▲12,0%
7	Horta Airport	HOR	Azores	258,500	▲7.7%	tbc	▲12,0%
8	Porto Santo Airport	PXO	Madeira	175,300	▲14,6%	tbc	▲12,0%
9	Santa Maria Airport	SMA	Azores	93,436	▲14,6%	tbc	▲12,0%
10	Flores Airport	FLW	Azores	64,000	▲15,8%	tbc	▲12,0%
11	Pico Airport	PIX	Azores	119,000	▲14,6%	738	▲12,0%
12	Sao Jorge Airport	SJZ	Azores	TBC	▲14,6%	738	▲12,0%
13	Graciosa Airport	GRW	Azores	TBC	▲14,6%	738	▲12,0%
14	Corvo Airport	CVU	Azores	7,107	▲14,6%	288	▲12,0%

=== 2023 ===
Rank	Airport	IATA	Region	Total passengers	Annual change	Total movements	Annual change
1	Lisbon Airport	LIS	Lisbon	33,648,691	▲18.8%	tbc	▲10,2%
2	Porto Airport	OPO	Porto	15,204,882	▲15,0%	tbc	▲11,6%
3	Faro Airport	FAO	Faro	9,641,820	▲14,4%	tbc	▲1,6%
4	Madeira Airport	FNC	Madeira	4,590,098	▲7,9%	tbc	▲12,0%
5	Ponta Delgada Airport	PDL	Azores	2,470,723	▲9%	tbc	▲13,3%
6	Terceira Airport	TER	Azores	963,338	▲14,6%	tbc	▲12,0%
7	Horta Airport	HOR	Azores	298,024	▲7.7%	tbc	▲12,0%
8	Porto Santo Airport	PXO	Madeira	246,807	▲14,6%	tbc	▲12,0%
9	Pico Airport	PIX	Azores	207,428	▲14,6%	738	▲12,0%
10	Santa Maria Airport	SMA	Azores	126,480	▲14,6%	tbc	▲12,0%
11	Sao Jorge Airport	SJZ	Azores	103,132	▲14,6%	738	▲12,0%
12	Flores Airport	FLW	Azores	98,406	▲15,8%	tbc	▲12,0%
13	Graciosa Airport	GRW	Azores	69,602	▲14,6%	738	▲12,0%
14	Corvo Airport	CVU	Azores	11,648	▲14,6%	288	▲12,0%
15	Beja Airport	BYJ	Alentejo	4,968	▲ tbc	tbc	▲12,0%
