= Flores Airport =

Flores Airport Aeroporto das Flores
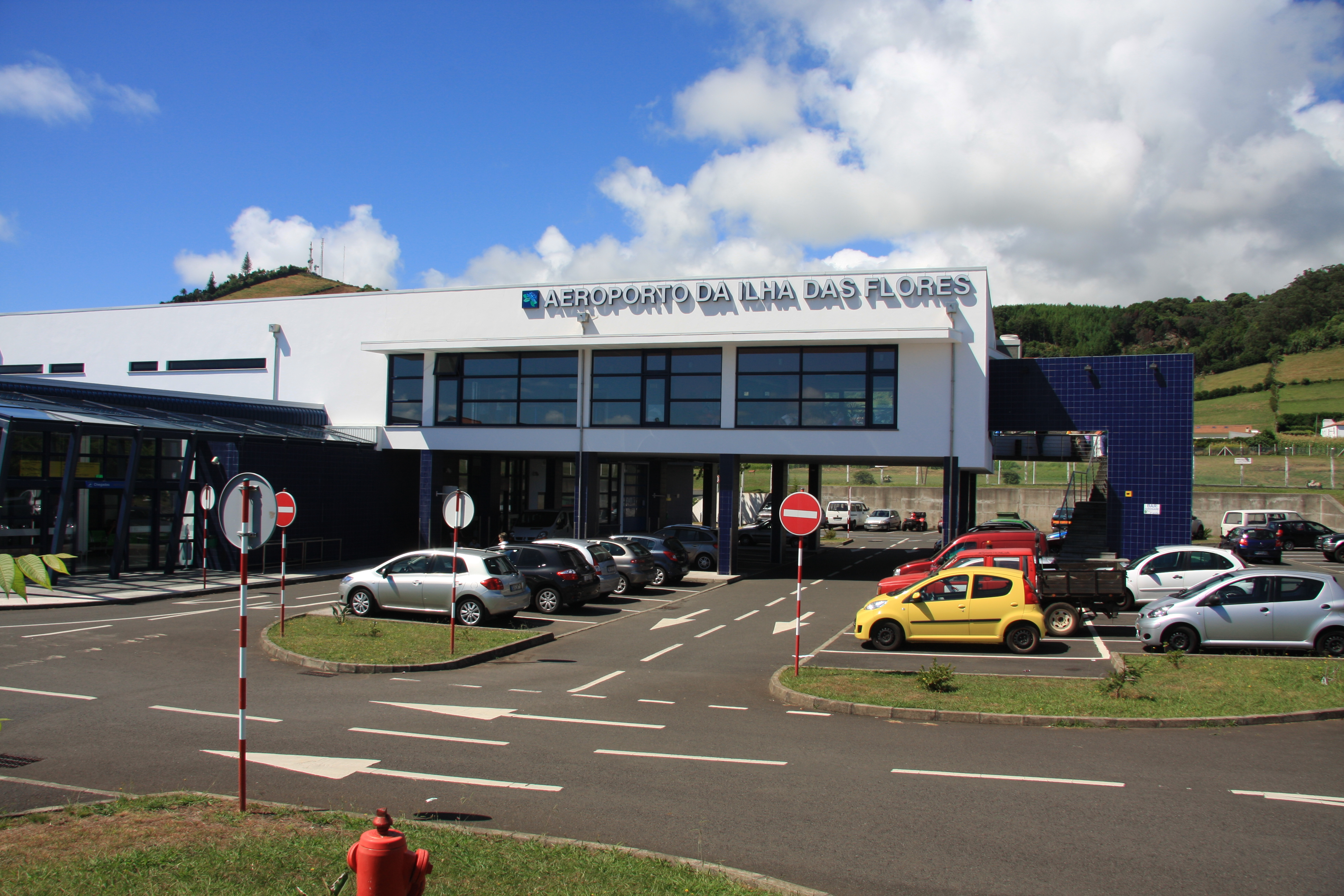
- IATA: FLW; ICAO: LPFL; WMO: 08501

Summary
- Airport type: Public
- Owner: Government of Portugal
- Operator: ANA Aeroportos de Portugal
- Serves: Santa Cruz das Flores, Azores, Portugal
- Location: Santa Cruz das Flores
- Elevation AMSL: 32 m (105 ft)
- Coordinates: 39°27′29″N 031°07′56″W
- Website: floresairport.pt

Map
- Location in the Azores

Runways
| Direction | Length | | Surface |
| Direction | m | ft | Surface |
|---|---|---|---|
| 18/36 | 1,400 | 4,593 | Asphalt |

Statistics (2016)
- Passengers: 55264
- Aircraft Operations: 738
- Metric tonnes of cargo: 322

Flores Airport (IATA: FLW, ICAO: LPFL) (Portuguese: Aeroporto das Flores) is a regional airport on the island of Flores in the Portuguese archipelago of the Azores. It is located along the eastern coast, bisecting the regional capital of Santa Cruz das Flores into two halves: from the Porto of São Pedro the runway is aligned north–south to the area around Porto dos Poços. The airport divides the area of Monte and Pau Pique (in the headlands) and the central community of Santa Cruz das Flores (located on a fajã, or geological debris field), from the Porto do Boqueirão to Porto Velho along the eastern coast.

== History ==
The first need for an airport/airfield on the island of Flores was recognized in 1927 by the Marquis Francesco de Pinedo, colonel of the Italian Air Force, who was forced to land 200 km (120 mi) from the island of Flores, during his attempt to reach Newfoundland. His Savoia-Marchetti S.55 hydroplane, baptized Santa Maria II, was rescued by the Portuguese fishing boat Infantes de Sagres (heading for the Grand Banks to fish cod) and towed to Horta, where it was repaired.

But, it was only in 1972 that an airport was inaugurated on the island of Flores.

Along with the airports in Lisbon, Porto, Faro, Horta, Vila do Porto, Ponta Delgada and Beja, the airport's concessions to provide support to civil aviation was conceded to ANA Aeroportos de Portugal on 18 December 1998, under provisions of decree 404/98. With this concession, ANA was also provided to the planning, development and construction of future infrastructures.

On 11 January 2013, a tender was issued by ANA Aeroportos to improve the accessibility within the airport, with installation of lifts, escalators and mechanical walkways, to be installed within the intervening five years.

== Airlines and destinations ==
The following airlines operate regular scheduled and charter flights at Flores Airport:

| Airlines | Destinations |
|---|---|
| SATA Air Açores | Corvo, Horta, Ponta Delgada, Terceira |

== See also ==
- Aviation in the Azores
