= Graciosa Airport =

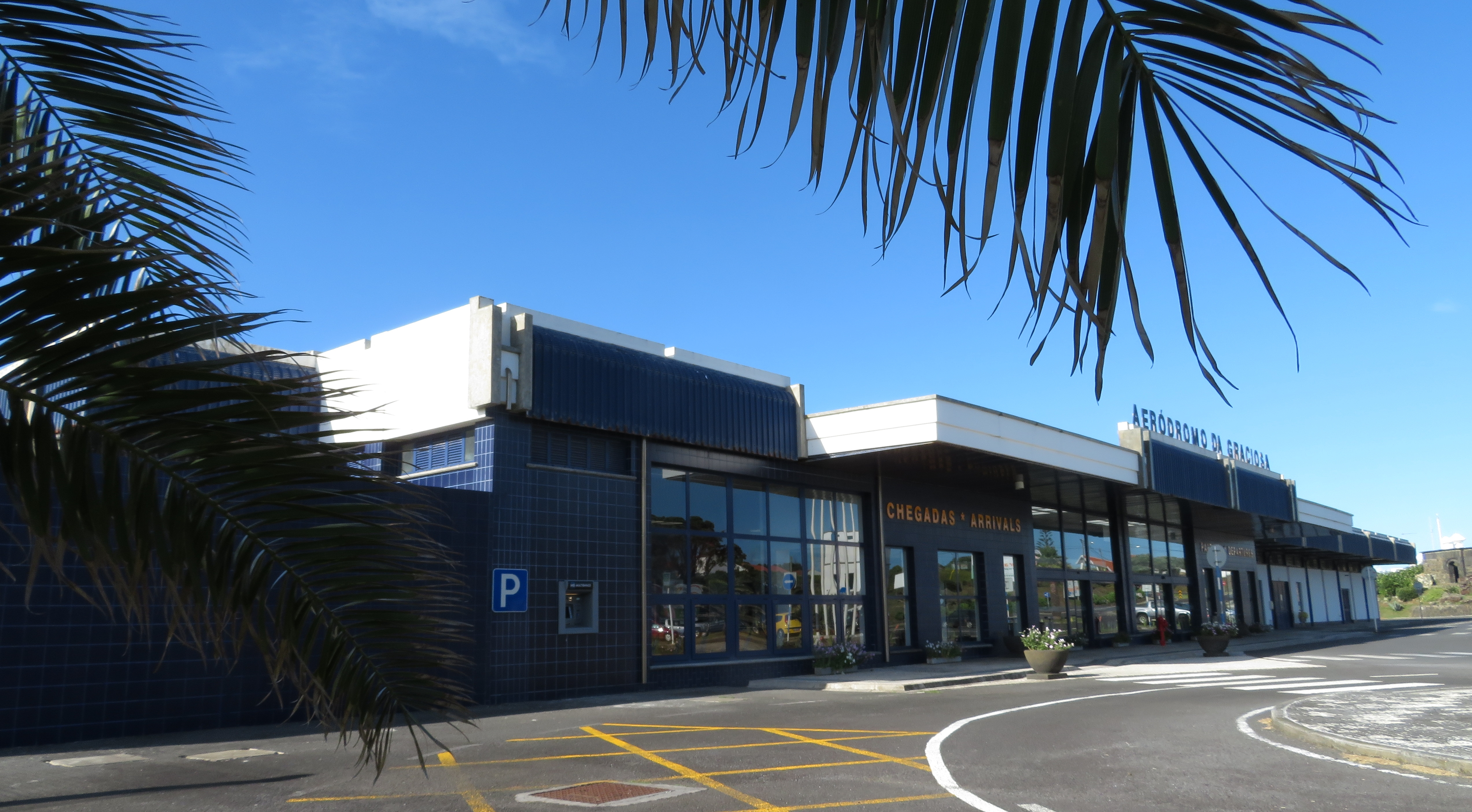
- IATA: GRW; ICAO: LPGR

Summary
- Airport type: Public
- Operator: ANA – Aeroportos de Portugal, SA
- Location: Santa Cruz da Graciosa
- Elevation AMSL: 26 m (85 ft)
- Coordinates: 39°05′32″N 028°01′46″W

Map
- Location in the Azores

Runways
Direction	Length		Surface
Direction	m	ft	Surface
09/27	1,385	4,544	Asphalt
- Sources: Portuguese AIP

Graciosa Airport (Portuguese: Aérodromo da Graciosa) (IATA: GRW, ICAO: LPGR) is an airport located 2 km (1.2 mi) west northwest of Santa Cruz da Graciosa on Graciosa Island in the Azores.

== History ==
Located at Barro Vermelho, between Dores and Ponta da Barca, it was projected in 1973, but only had the project and topographical surveys concluded in 1976, already by the regional authorities.

Built by the Azorean Regional Government between September 1979 and July 1981, its runway, 1325 meters long, was inaugurated on July 11, 1981. The original small air terminal was replaced by a new one, inaugurated on October 1, 2001.

== Airlines and destinations ==
The following airlines operate regular scheduled and charter flights at Graciosa Airport:

Airlines	Destinations
SATA Air Açores	Terceira

== See also ==
Aviation in the Azores
