= Santa Maria Airport (Azores) =

International airport serving Vila do Porto, Santa Maria Island, the Azores

Santa Maria Airport Aeroporto de Santa Maria

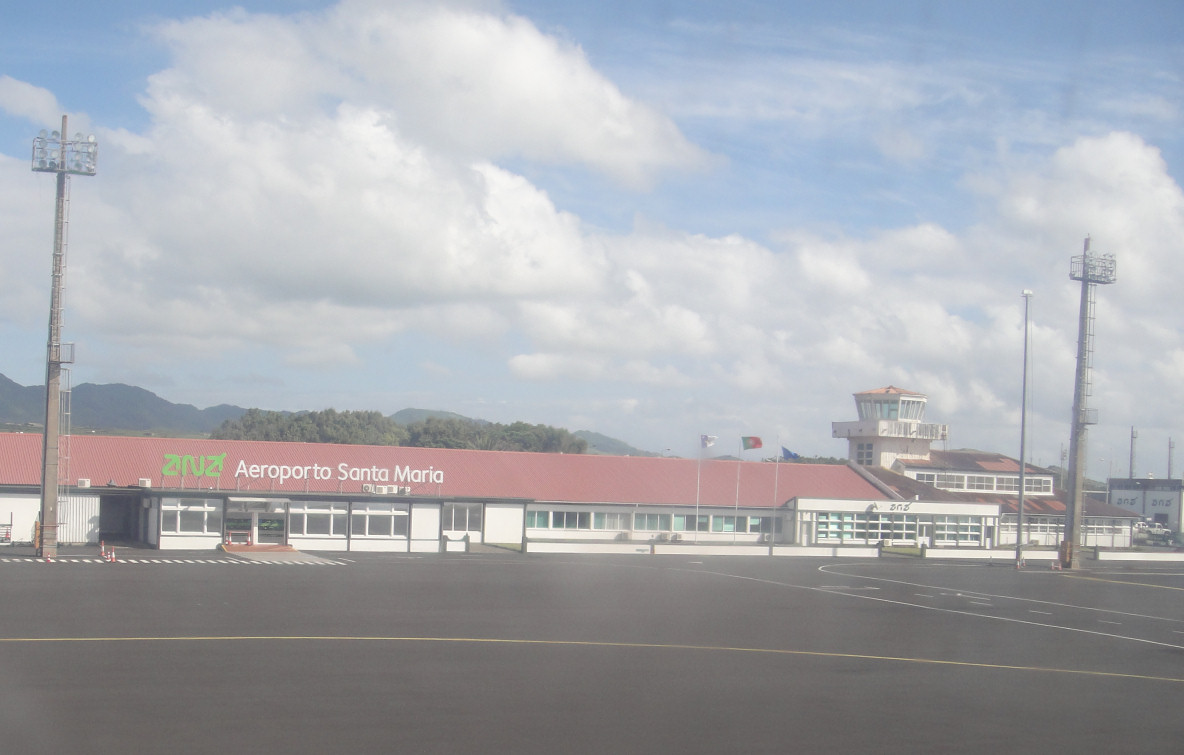
- IATA: SMA; ICAO: LPAZ

Summary
- Airport type: Public
- Owner: ANA Aeroportos de Portugal
- Operator: Vinci SA
- Serves: Vila do Porto
- Location: Santa Maria Island (Azores), Portugal
- Opened: 26 July 1945
- Focus city for: SATA Air Açores
- Built: 1945
- In use: 2
- Time zone: Azores (−01:00)
  - Summer (DST): Azores (01:00)
- Elevation AMSL: 94 m (308 ft)
- Coordinates: 36°58′26″N 25°10′16″W
- Website: aeroportosantamaria.pt

Map
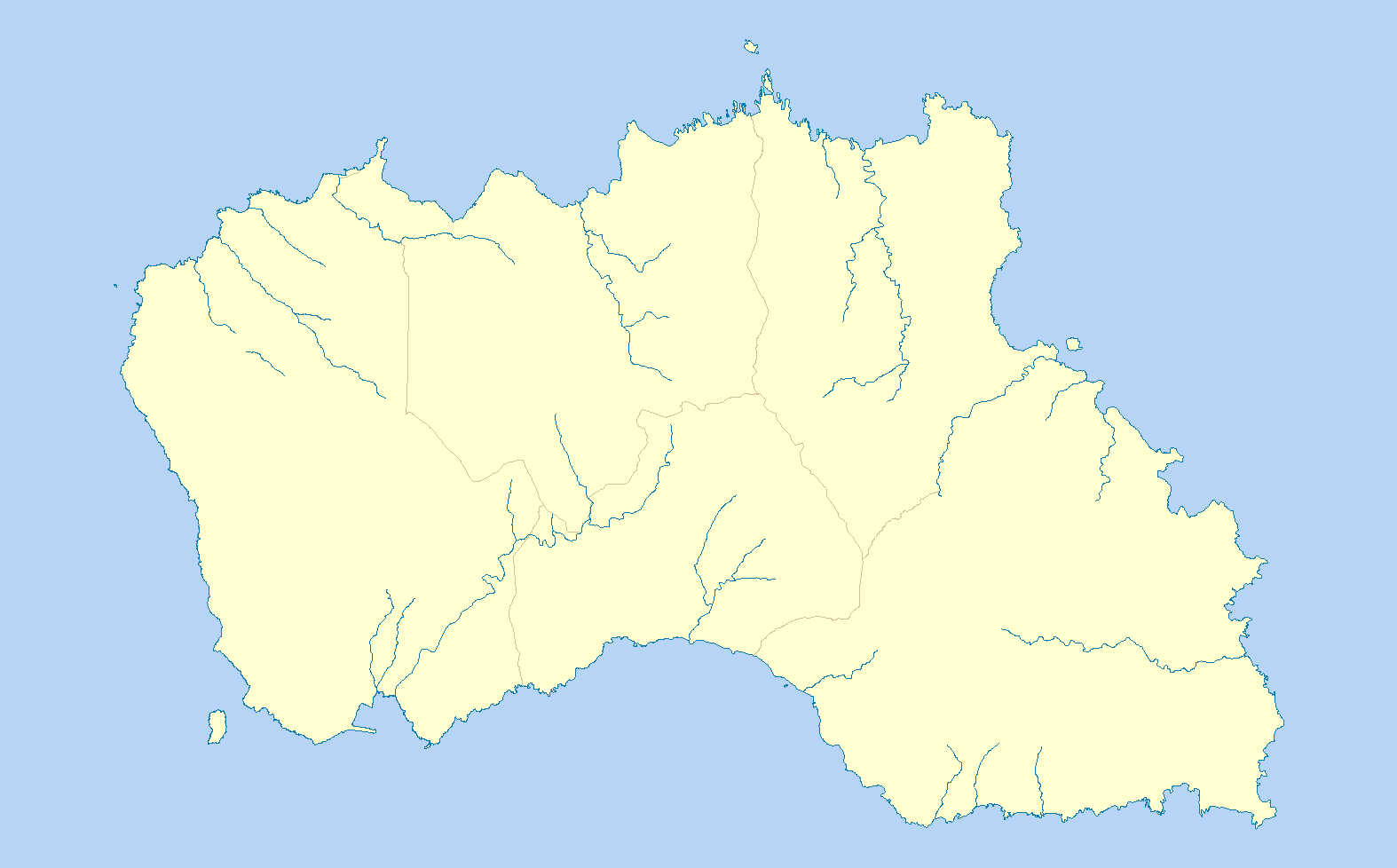
- Location of the airport on the island of Santa Maria LPAZ (Santa Maria, Azores)

Runways
Direction	Length		Surface
Direction	ft	m	Surface
18/36	10,000	3,048	Concrete

Statistics (2011)
- Passengers: 93,436
- Aircraft Operations: 3,176
- Metric tonnes of cargo: 2697.6
- Source: Portuguese AIP

Santa Maria Airport (IATA: SMA, ICAO: LPAZ) is an international airport located 5 km (3.1 mi) west northwest of the urbanized area of Vila do Porto on the island of Santa Maria, in the Portuguese autonomous region of the Azores. A principal hub in transatlantic travel until the end of the 20th century, it was constructed at the start of the Second World War to protect Allied convoys by American troops who were ceded authority until its end. From this period on, the airfield took on a commercial role, reinforced by inter-island travel and connections to Europe, resulting in its obtaining the communication duties for the North Atlantic sector of the airspace corridor.

== History ==
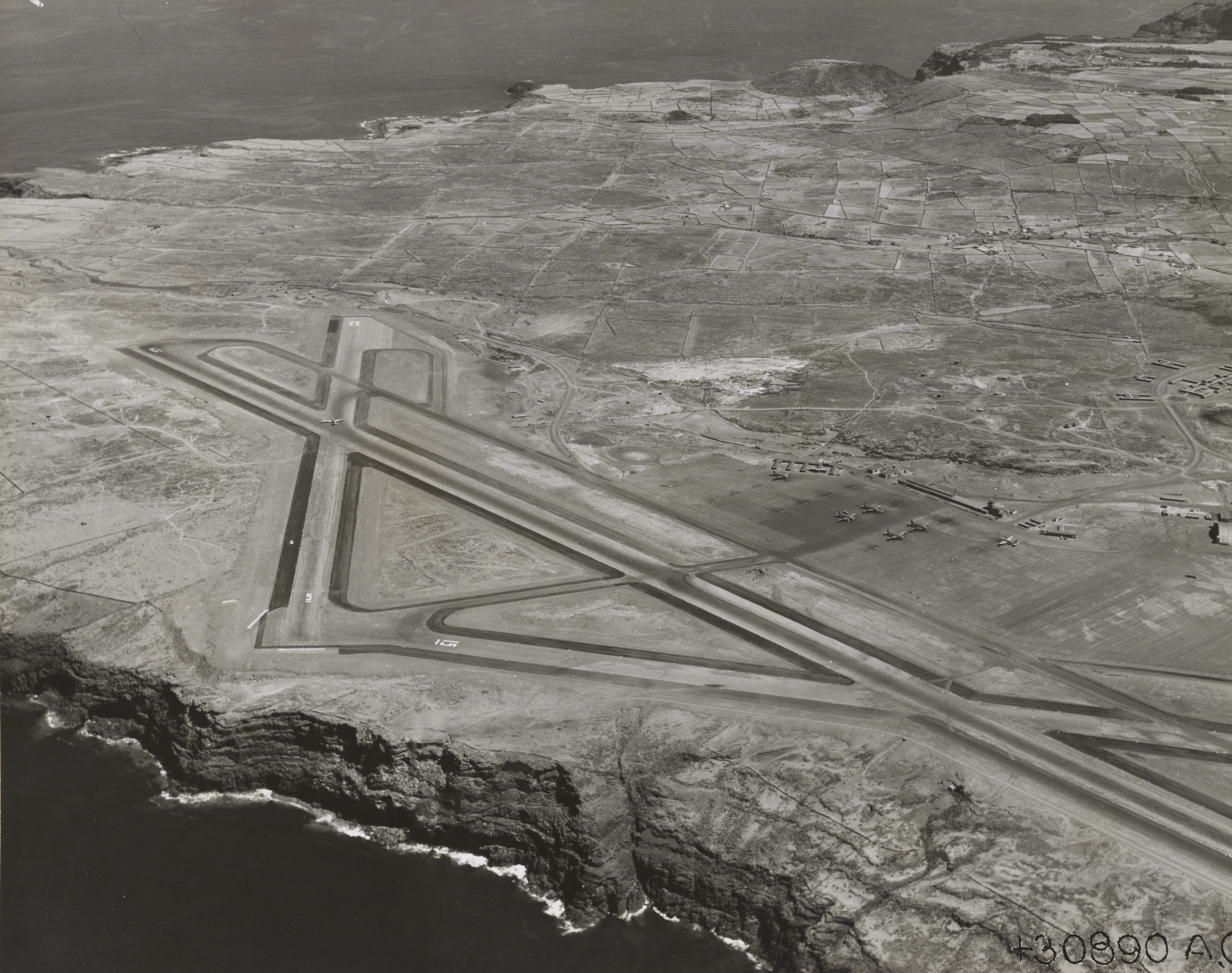
Aerial view of the airport, shortly after construction 1946

In the context of the Second World War, in July 1941, a Portuguese mission under the command of engineer Colonel Hermínio José de Sousa Serrano, and which included Colonel Frederico Lopes da Silva and Major Fernando Tártaro, visited Santa Maria to study a possible location for an airfield, opting for the plateau known as Pico de Maria Dias. Two years later, technicians from Pan American World Airways arrived on the island, arriving on board the NT Lima in December 1943, and confirmed that the location was optimal for establishing a military airfield to complement the field at Lajes. The airfield would, therefore, assist in the protection of the maritime convoys that crossed the Atlantic to support the port of Murmansk in the Soviet Union, which were being sunk by German U-boats.

The project that was planned, and which was sent for approval to António de Oliveira Salazar, included provisions for an inter-island and a trans-oceanic airport, with the first costing 1.685 million US dollars, and the second 5.125 million US dollars. The final plan, sent to the Portuguese government by Pan American, and contracting the construction was an estimated 3.130 million US dollars, and included:

- Construction of two piers at the port;
- Expansion of the wharf and ramp;
- Improvements to the roads, bends and bridges;
- Construction of a roadway to the aerodrome;
- Construction of three runways: 2 2,000 by 50 metres (6,560 ft × 160 ft) and 1 1,400 by 50 metres (4,590 ft × 160 ft), with an area of 270,000 square metres (2,900,000 ft^{2});
- A platform/tarmac for parking aircraft that was 150 by 150 metres (490 ft × 490 ft);
- A control tower and station building; and
- A water supply and sewage network.

=== Military airfield ===
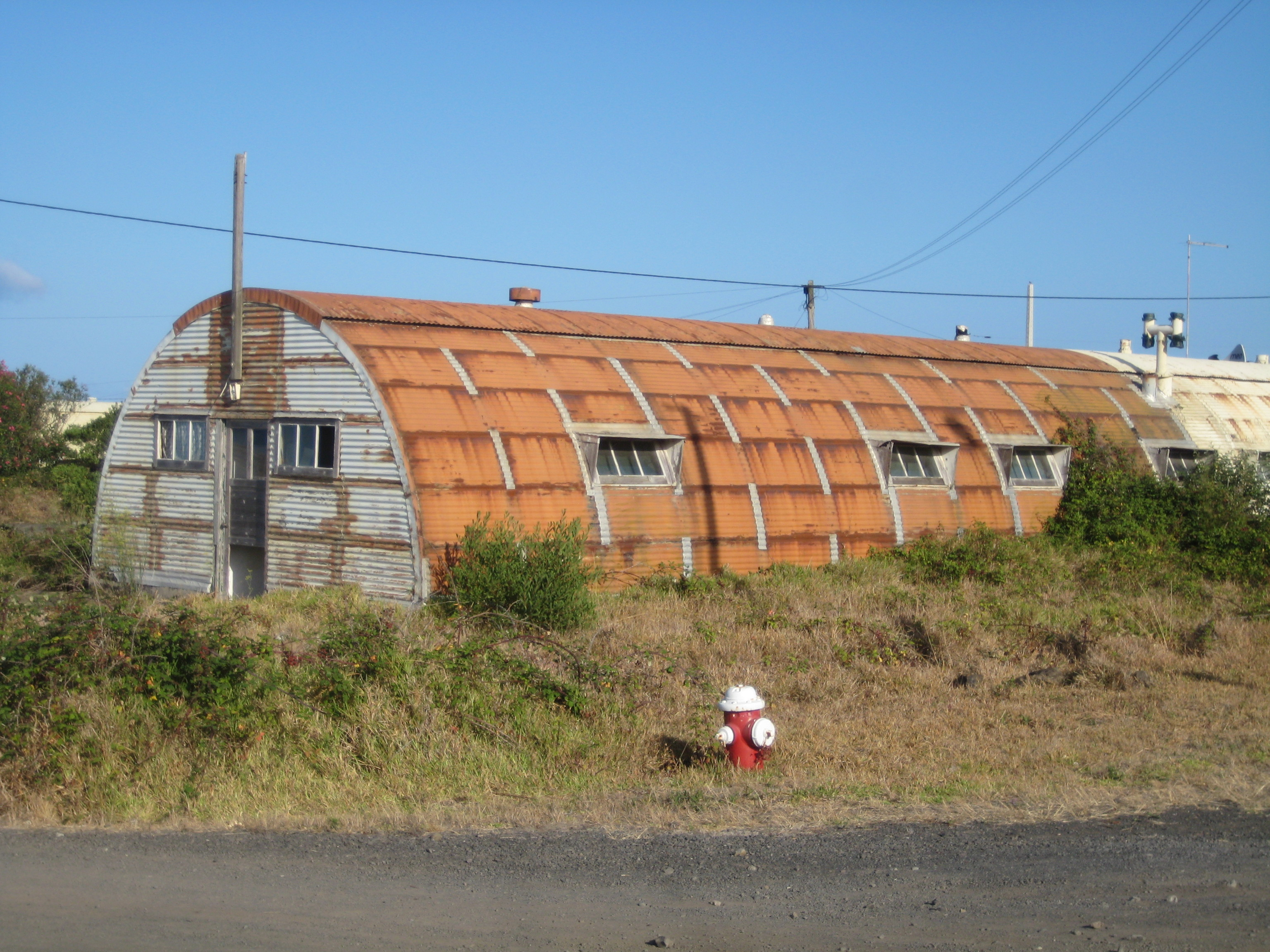
A World War II Quonset hut used to lodge members of the military

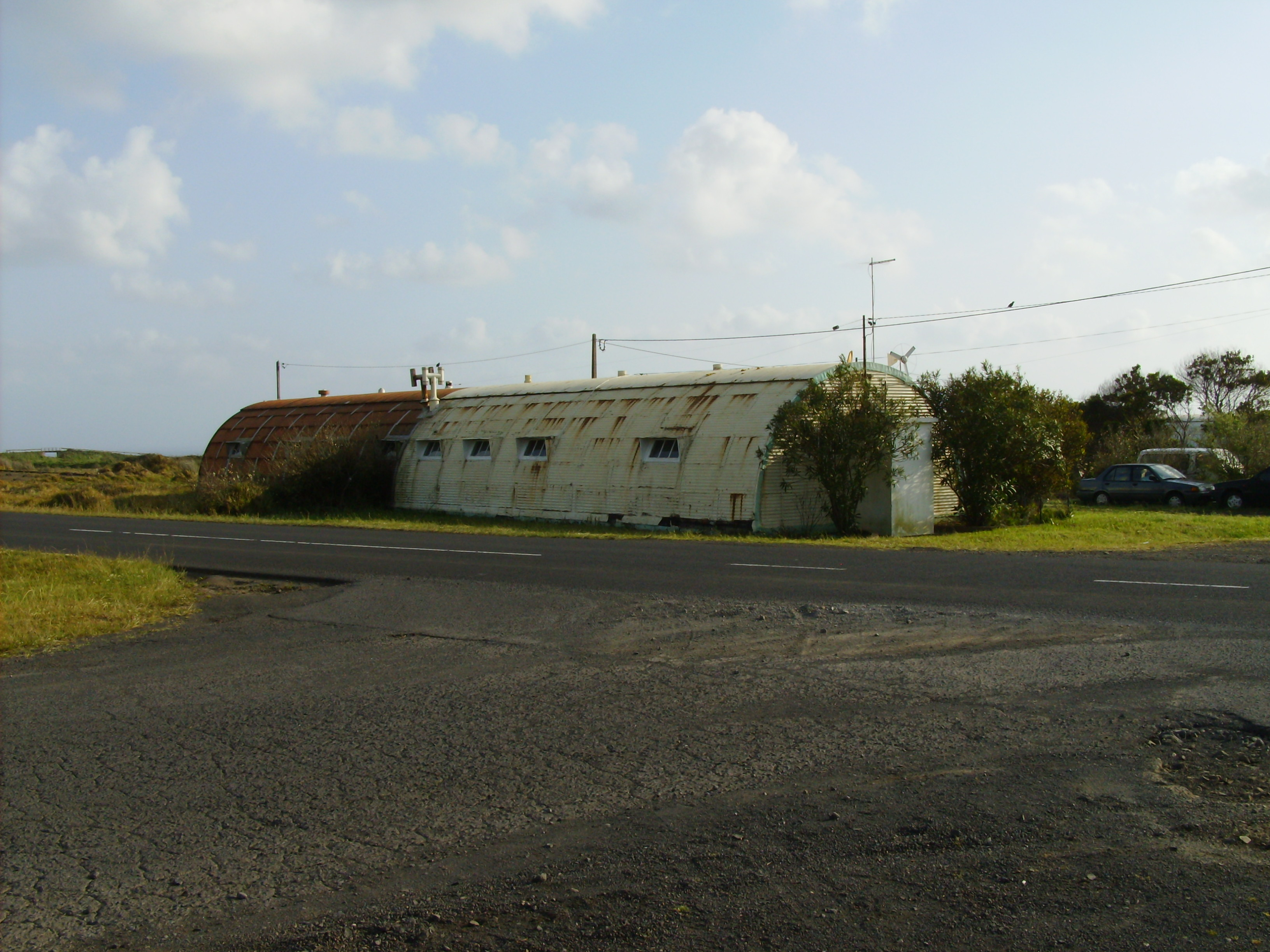
Another Quonset hut that remains in the district of Aeroporto, literally Airport

While the final project was being prepared, the Portuguese Department of Defense authorized immediate execution of the first work, that included a runway to service planes transferred from Lajes Airfield, carrying with them the technicians and equipment. Along with a team of little more than 40 workers, Lieutenant Engineer Correia de Sousa concluded the runway construction. On 8 August 1944, at about 2:15 p.m., the first plane landed on the runway, a Douglas C-47 Skytrain (Dakota C-47) operated by the US Air Force, transporting materials and bread from Terceira. It departed an hour later.

The Americans later extended the taxiways by another 200 metres (660 ft), and on 15 November 1944 a new 1,350 by 50 metres (4,430 ft × 160 ft) service runway was concluded (and which operated until 14 May 1945. The first runway was situated in the locality of Ginjal, it was a dirt runway covered with reinforced steel gridwork.

Finally, on 28 November 1944, an accord was signed between the US and Portuguese governments, that envisioned its use as a waypoint for planes travelling to the Pacific theatre of operations, or those that needed to be diverted due to weather conditions. This was followed on 14 December 1944 by a similar accord between Pan American Airways and the Portuguese government, resulting in the installation of new radio equipment. Work on the passenger terminal and support buildings had already progressed, along with runways 2 and 3 and the parking area. At this time there were 3000 workers onsite: 2000 American, 600 Micaleanse and 400 Marienses, a number that continued to grow over time (eventually reaching 3000 Americans and 1000 Azoreans). Meanwhile, the port was expanded to receive battalions with the equipment necessary to improve the infrastructures and to construct a network to pipe aviation fuel to the plateau. These included: airport infrastructures; roadways; water supply and sewage; residences; and social spaces (such as hotel, gymnasium, church, a cinema/theatre to hold 1000 people, and a hospital in the area of Santana, to evacuate the injured in the European theatre).

On 11 July 1945, the first Portuguese-registered aircraft landed in Santa Maria, an Avro Anson Mk I from Terceira's Air Base No.4 (Lajes Airfield), followed by a C-54 "Skymaster" on 24 July from São Miguel, that included various Portuguese and American authorities visiting the installations to officially inaugurate the aerodrome on 26 July 1945. The aerodrome was operated by American forces until the end of the conflict, and accounted for 500 airplanes that transited the site.

=== Civil aviation ===
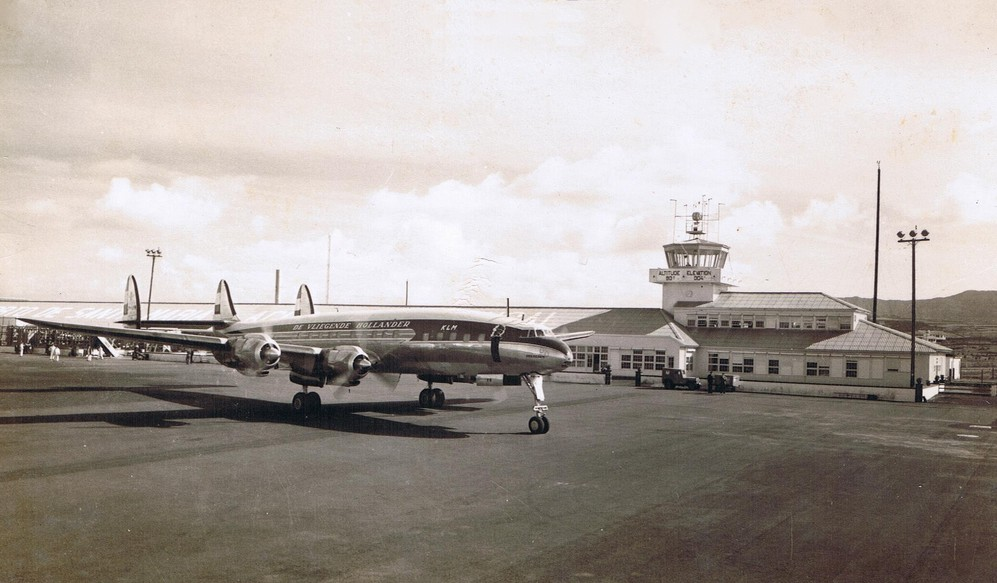
A KLM Constellation at Santa Maria Airport, during the era when the island was a stopover during transatlantic travel

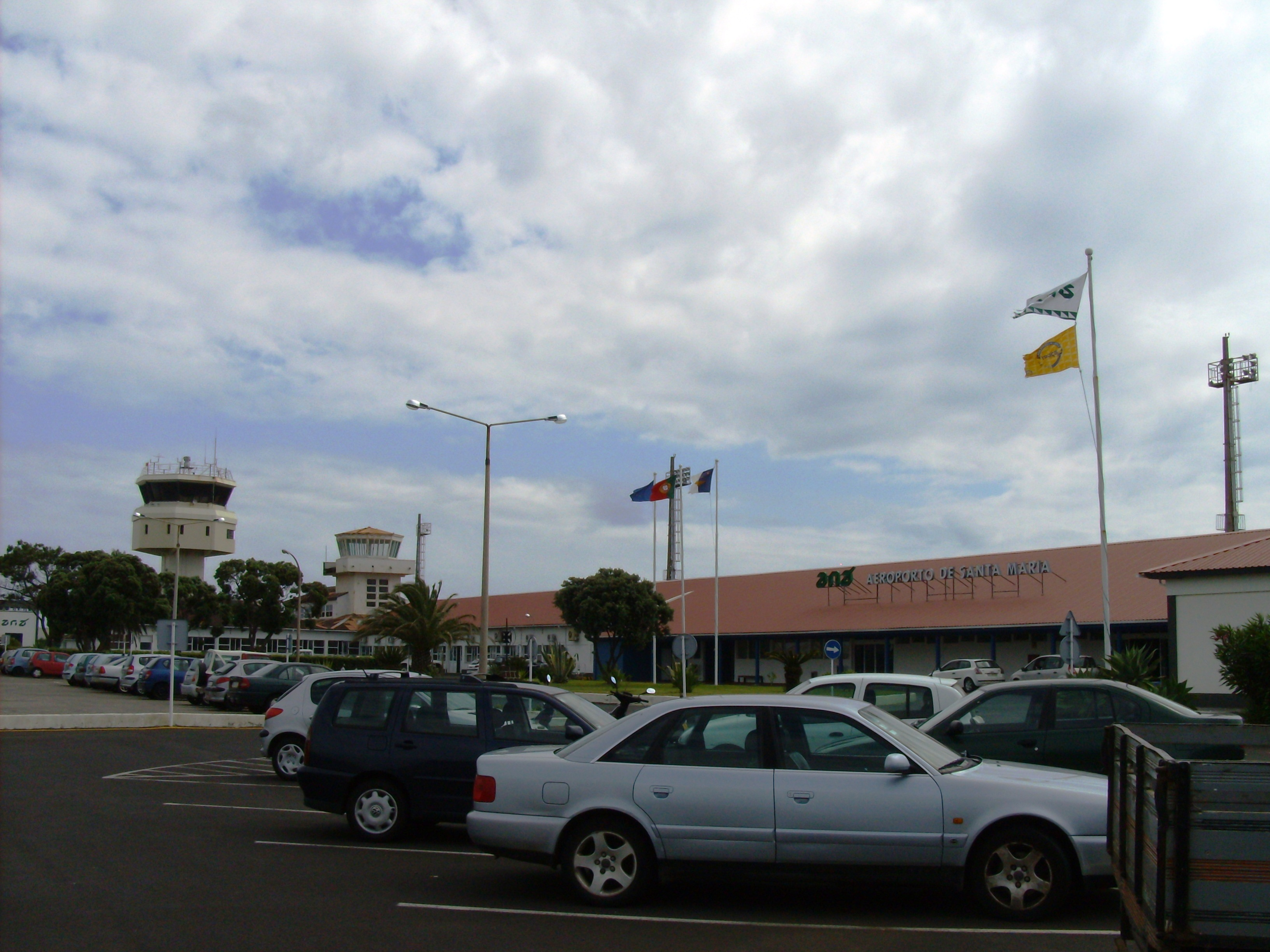
The main terminal buildings seen from the neighbourhood of Aeroporto

The accords between the Portuguese, Great Britain and the United States permitted those forces to use the facilities in Lajes and Santa Maria until 2 June 1946. At that time the American forces base was transferred to Lajes and both airports began to be administered from Portugal. By Decree-law 35/736 (5 July 1946 the airport at Santa Maria began to be administered by the Secretariado da Aeronáutica Civil (Civil Aeronautics Secretariate), later substituted by the Direcção Geral de Aeronáutica Civil (Directorate-General for Civil Aeronautics). After improvements to the runway, the airplane parking area and installations in the terminal, the airport was inspected by Lieutenant-Colonel Humberto Delgado (then-Director-General of the DGEC), for it to be certified for operational traffic. The first airplane to arrive following inspection was a Pan American Boeing 377 Stratocruiser, flying the New York-Leopoldville route, stopping at the Santa Maria waypoint on 29 October 1946. Other records refer to a Pan American Lockheed Constellation stopping on the same day.

Following the airport's certification for passenger service, Santa Maria was selected to operate as the air traffic control centre for North Atlantic region, under the responsibility of Portugal by the Provisional International Civil Aviation Organization (PICAO), in the first semester of 1946. During this period, due to an absence of coaxial cable link between Europe and the United States, Santa Maria became an important international centre for communications. Communications were limited to teletype and radio. With the 1965 installation of coaxial cable between the United States and England, all communications between the two continents began to intersect at Santa Maria. The airport was classified an ETOPS alternate, having suitable facilities to accommodate transatlantic flights needing to make an emergency landing.

The Santa Maria International Airport was re-inaugurated officially on 28 November 1946. The existing infrastructures were expanded in the meantime, with residential areas administrated and developed by architect Francisco Keil do Amaral, who tried to maintain the existing characteristics.

On 13 January 1947, Lieutenant Henrique Owen Pinto de Barros da Costa Pessoa was named first director of the airport.

The forerunner of SATA Air Açores (Sociedade Açoriana de Transportes Aéreos) initiated services to São Miguel on 5 August 1957, and to Terceira on 9 June 1947, using a Beechcraft D18S (CS-TAA) christened "Açor".

From 1940 to 1970, the airport was an important link in trans-Atlantic travel and the focus of the island economy and employment. First, during the construction the airport and support structures, attracting workers from São Miguel and the archipelago, then as a hub of aviation activities, supporting air traffic in the North Atlantic. Transportes Aéreos Portugueses (TAP) (the national flag carrier began layover flights to the airport on 7 December 1962, eventually inaugurating trans-Atlantic service between Santa Maria-New York (26 April 1969) and Santa Maria-Montreal (8 May 1971). Santa Maria was the unique gateway for passengers entering or exiting the Azores; it served as a destination, stopover and intercontinental waypoints for European, North American, Central American and South American airlines, in addition to Caribbean airways, including:

- Aeroflot, which began to use Santa Maria as waypoint to Cuba (during the 1960s)
- Aeroméxico
- Air France, began to use Santa Maria as a stopover in 1948
- Avianca
- British Airways
- Canadian Pacific Air Lines
- Iberia
- LTU International
- Lufthansa
- KLM, first to establish a connection to New York through Santa Maria (on 21 May 1946)
- Pan American World Airways, began stopovers to Santa Maria in 1947
- Panair do Brasil
- Surinam Airways
- Swissair, began to stopover in Santa Maria in 1954
- Trans World Airlines
- Viasa, stopovers between Caribbean destinations and Europe starting in 1960

Commencing in the late 1970s, Air France's supersonic Concordes were routed via Santa Maria as a technical stop for refueling on weekly scheduled SST flights between Paris and Caracas.

Along with the airports in Lisbon, Porto, Faro, Flores, Horta, Ponta Delgada and Beja, the airport's concessions to provide support to civil aviation were conceded to ANA Aeroportos de Portugal on 18 December 1998, under provisions of decree 404/98. With this concession, ANA was also provided to the planning, development and construction of future infrastructures.

== District ==
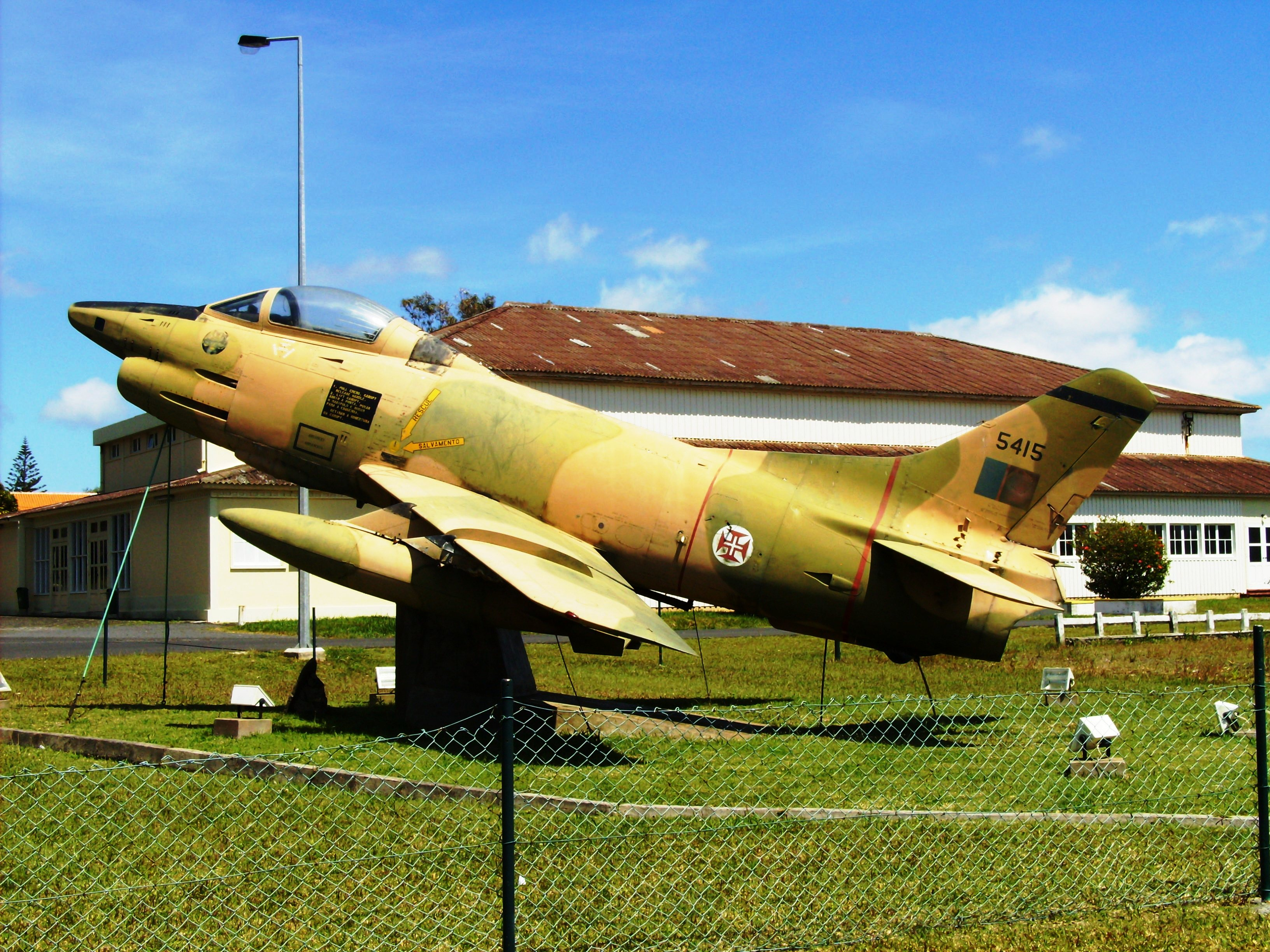
A FIAT G91 on display in the neighbourhood of Aeroporto

The airport at Santa Maria was part of a larger complex of buildings and infrastructures constructed in the 20th century. Apart from the airport terminals and ground control facilities, the area later known as Aeroporto locally, included a residential barrio, the services and equipment to support local residences, roadways and many of first signals, public transport stops and electrical transformer stations. The development of this district was important in the development of the island, with many of the installations left by American troops after the Second World War (the early terminal, control tower, building of Clube Asas do Atlântico, gymnasium, cinemas and warehouses) and many of the semi-cylindrical troop-quarters retained after the withdraw of forces. Its North American influence and original purpose marks its differences to local construction; the urban design and buildings, just like many of the projected constructions by architect Keil do Amaral (the airport, residence of airport director, groups of residences and signalling) make the district distinct from the other areas of the island. The newer neighborhoods and recent buildings, are of an inferior architectural quality, and correspond to the blocks closer to the airport.

== Airlines and destinations ==
The following airlines operate regular scheduled and charter flights at Santa Maria Airport:

Airlines	Destinations
Azores Airlines	Lisbon
SATA Air Açores	Ponta Delgada

== Accidents and incidents ==
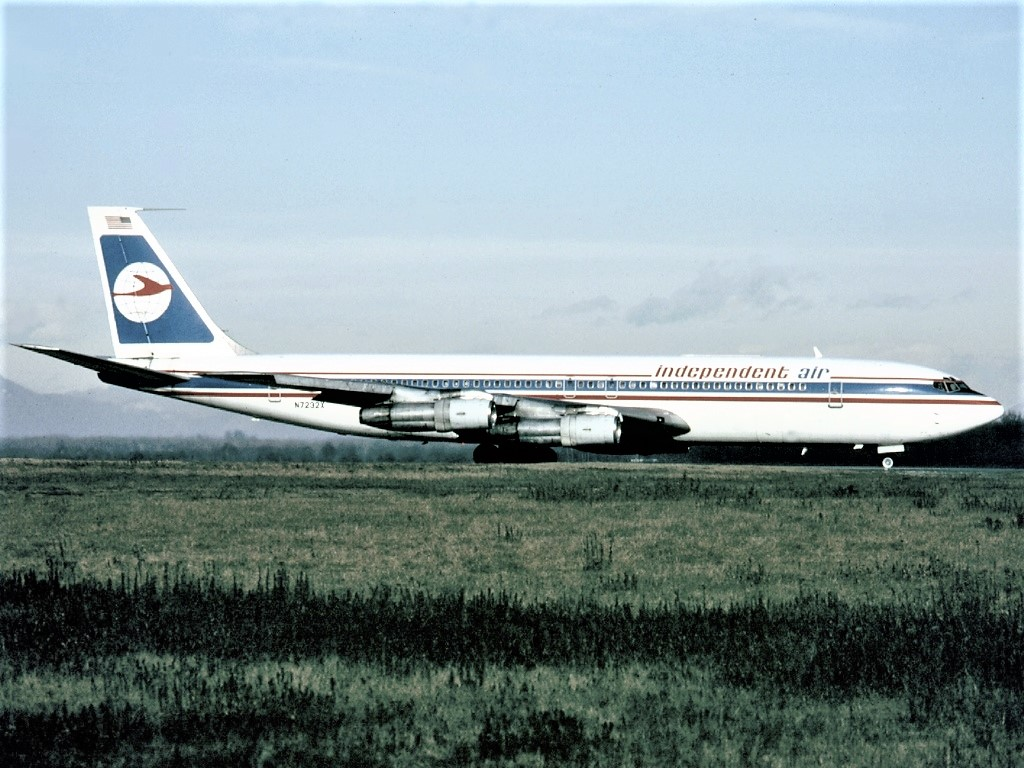
Independent Air Boeing 707 involved in a fatal incident in the hills of Pico Alto

- Air France Flight 009, a Lockheed Constellation flying from Paris to New York, struck the Redondo Mountain on the approach to its intermediate stop at Santa Maria on 28 October 1949. All 11 crew members and 37 passengers on board were killed, including French boxing champion Marcel Cerdan and French classical violinist Ginette Neveu. Probable causes included poor reporting by the crew and failure to carry out approach procedures.
- A chartered Boeing 707-300 (N7231T), Independent Air Flight 1851 from Bergamo, Italy, in 1989 crashed on approach to Santa Maria Airport, when it struck the Pico Alto mountain. The aircraft was destroyed with the loss of all passengers (137) and crew (7). The accident was the result of bad communication and failure to follow standard procedures by crew and air traffic control.
- An Avianca Airlines Boeing 787 traveling from Madrid to Bogota had to make an emergency landing at SMA on 23 June 2018 when an electrical system in the airplane triggered an alarm.
- An Avianca Airlines Boeing 787 traveling from Madrid to Bogota made an emergency landing at SMA on 30 November 2023 due to yet-unspecified technical problems.

== See also ==
- Aviation in the Azores
