= Aviation in the Azores =

Aviation in the Azores is part of the greater history of aviation in Portugal, and involves the historical use of the archipelago of the Azores by North American, South American and European pioneers of aviation. The Azores is strategically located in the centre of the North Atlantic Ocean between the continents of North America and Europe, and has played a historical role in trans-Atlantic navigation. The three primary airfields of the Azores are:

- Santa Maria Airport, the historical hub of commercial air transport.
- Lajes Field, the primary military services field, also serving civilian aviation.
- Ponta Delgada (Nordela) João Paulo II Airport, the current hub of commercial air transport.

Due to the relative distance between the islands of the archipelago, aviation is in many instances more viable than boat transportation, with inter-island flights being a crucial part of the Azorean infrastructure.

== History ==
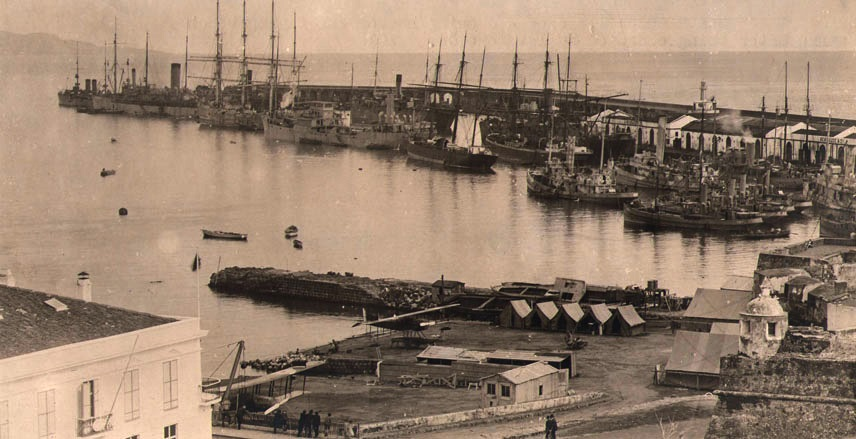
The 1st U.S. Aeronautical company in Ponta Delgada (21 January 1918); one of the first completely equipped American aviation units to serve overseas in World War I

=== First World War ===
In December 1916, an unidentified German submarine bombarded the Azorean island of Faial. The following year, SM U-155 shelled Ponta Delgada on 4 July 1917.

With the U.S. entry into the First World War the previous year, American naval forces occupied and operated a naval base in Ponta Delgada, consisting of a few Curtiss HS2L hydroplanes, 150 infantrymen, two pieces of artillery, some ships, and submarines. The first of the contingent began patrolling on 23 February 1918, alongside the São Brás Fort in Ponta Delgada. Their mission was to identify and combat German submarines that tracked merchant shipping in the Atlantic, and protect the waters of the Azores.

Even during the conflict, and following its events, the Portuguese Navy already projected the installation of a permanent naval air station in Horta (Portuguese: Centro Aero-Naval), which never materialized. Similarly, in 1919, the British Royal Air Force planned the possibility of acquiring one of the Portuguese islands in the Azores, to install a terrestrial base to provide support to air operation in the mid-Atlantic.

=== Interwar period ===
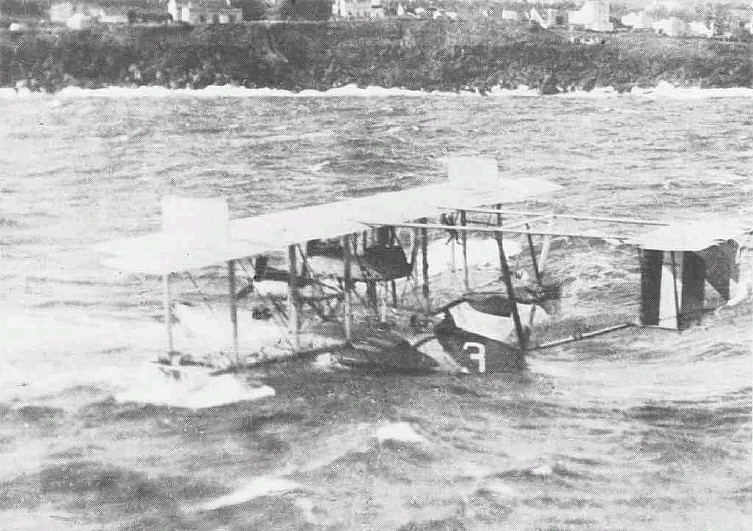
The NC-3, one of the three hydroplanes commanded by Albert Cushing Read, that was unable to complete its trans-Atlantic journey, in Ponta Delgada (19 May 1919)

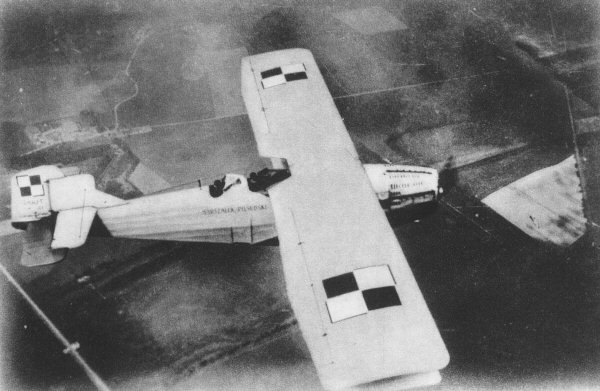
The Amiot 123 piloted by Idzikowski and Kubala that was destroyed in Graciosa, on the Polish trans-Atlantic flight attempt

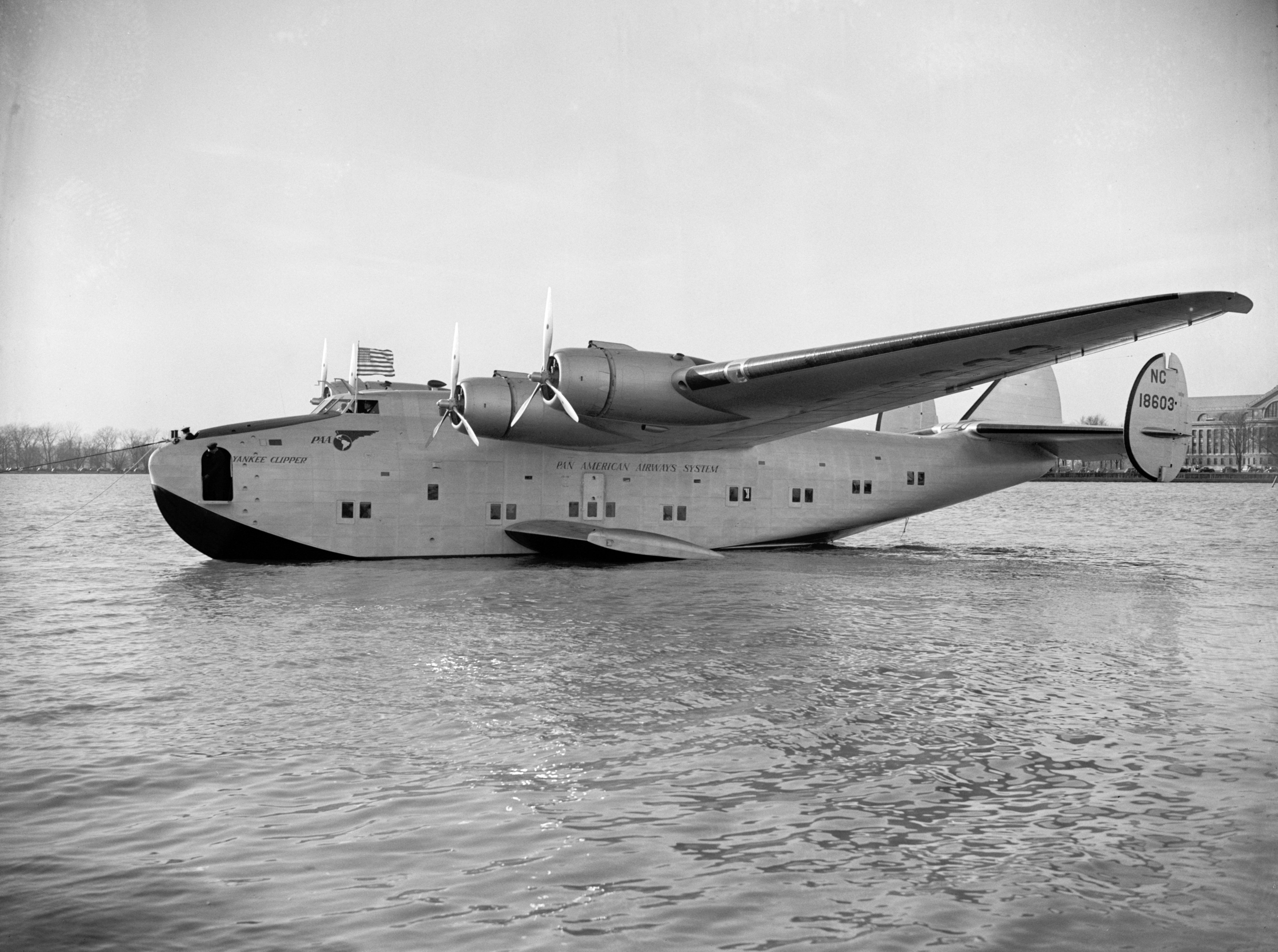
The Yankee Clipper, which started the trans-Atlantic mail service and frequently stopped in Horta (en route to Lisbon): it crashed in Lisbon on 22 February 1943

During the inter-war years, trans-Atlantic competition persisted between British and American entrepreneurs; the London-based Daily Mail promoted a competition worth £10,000, to the aviator who was able to cross the Atlantic non-stop, within 72 consecutive hours, between the United States, Canada or Newfoundland to any point in Great Britain or Ireland. In this context, three four-engine hydroplanes of the American Navy attempted the first non-stop trans-Atlantic crossing between 16–17 May 1919. Two of the planes (NC-1 and NC-3) made emergency landings near Flores: NC-1 was completely damaged, while the NC-3 was able to continue to Ponta Delgada (by 19 May), but unable to complete the journey. NC-4, under the command of Lieutenant-Commander Albert Cushing Read was able to survive the attempt, stopping in the Bay of Horta on 17 May, and continuing to Ponta Delgada (where he stopped on 20 May). After a week of rest, the team left on the morning of 27 May in the direction of Lisbon, arriving in the capital in the evening and anchoring in the Tagus River.

Still in 1919, a hydroplane travelling from England to the United States stopped in Faial, which became a frequent occurrence over time, utilizing Horta as a stopover.

With the advent of commercial dirigibles, the archipelago was over-flown in 1924, 1927 and 1930, by Zeppelins making the connection between Germany and the United States.

In April 1926, a Fokker hydroplane, baptized Infante de Sagres, departed from Lisbon, under the command of Portuguese Navy pilots Moreira de Campos and Neves Ferreira, intentionally to connect Madeira and the Azores, arriving in Ponta Delgada on 9 May 1926.

Following this first flight, in 1927, the Marquess Francesco De Pinedo, colonel in the Italian Air Force, was forced to ditch his plane 200 kilometres from the island of Flores, after departing Newfoundland. The Savoia-Marchetti S.55 hydroplane, named the Santa Maria II, was recovered and arrived in Horta, where it was repaired.

Later that year, in October/November, a Junkers G 24 (D-1230) and a Heinkel (D-1220) hydroplane stopped off in Horta, where they encountered American aviation pioneer Ruth Elder, who was trying to emulate Charles Lindbergh's feat. Piloting a small monoplane, that she named American Girl, and accompanied by Captain George Haldeman, she was forced to ditch her plane in the waters along the north coast the island of Terceira due to mechanical problems, and the aircraft caught fire.

In June 1928, English pilot Frank T. Courtney, piloting a Dornier Wal G-CAGI, and later in July, a French Lieutenant in a small hydroplane named La Frégate, stopped in Horta on their transAtlantic flights.

In Graciosa, on the morning of 13 June 1929, an Amiot 123 biplane overturned during an attempted emergency landing in some fields near Brasileira. The plane, piloted by Polish aviators Major Ludwik Idzikowski and Kazimierz Kubala had departed early that morning from Le Bourget field, in the suburbs of Paris, as part of their first trans-Atlantic crossing, heading for New York. Idzikowski was killed in the accident and Kubala suffered minor injuries, while the plane was consumed by flames during the rescue, when someone approached the wreckage with a torch. A cross was erected to mark the location of the accident.

The following year, the Portuguese armed forces supported the idea to construct an airfield on the island of Terceira. On 4 October 1930, the first mono-motor Avro 504K biplane called the Açor, piloted by local Frederico Coelho de Melo departed from the 600-metre-long and 70-metre-wide runway.

Between 1930 and 1933, the American Pan American completed tests in Horta bay as part of their plans to operate trans-Atlantic routes between North America and Europe. In this context, Charles Lindbergh (accompanied by his wife Anne Morrow) in service of Pan American, landed on 21 November 1933, with his Lockheed 8 Sirius monoplane. After these tests, between 1937 and 1944, Pan America's Flying Boats (Boeing 314 Clippers) routinely made the New York–Marseilles and New York–London routes with stopovers in Lisbon. The New York–London leg of the flight had a 23-hour-and-55-minute duration, and included a one-hour-and-thirty-minute layover in Faial, while the Lisbon–Marseille route consumed an additional seven hours. The use of Faial as a technical layover was also used by other companies, who used the waters between Faial and Pico on stopovers between North America and Europe.

In April 1931, during the Azores Revolt, three small hydroplanes of the Portuguese Navy used Horta as a base to overfly Angra do Heroísmo and Monte Brasil. These planes dropped pamphlets onto the island in order to convince the mutineers to surrender.

In 1933, a squadron of 24 hydroplanes commanded by Italo Balbo arrived in the archipelago: nine landed in the port of Horta, while the remaining continued onto Ponta Delgada, where one was lost en route.

A year later, on 19 May 1938, a comparable squadron of four tri-motor aerial reconnaissance Bréguet 521 Bizerte of the 1st Atlantic Light Squadron landed in Ponta Delgada, before one continued on to Horta and another to Angra do Heroísmo.

=== Second World War ===
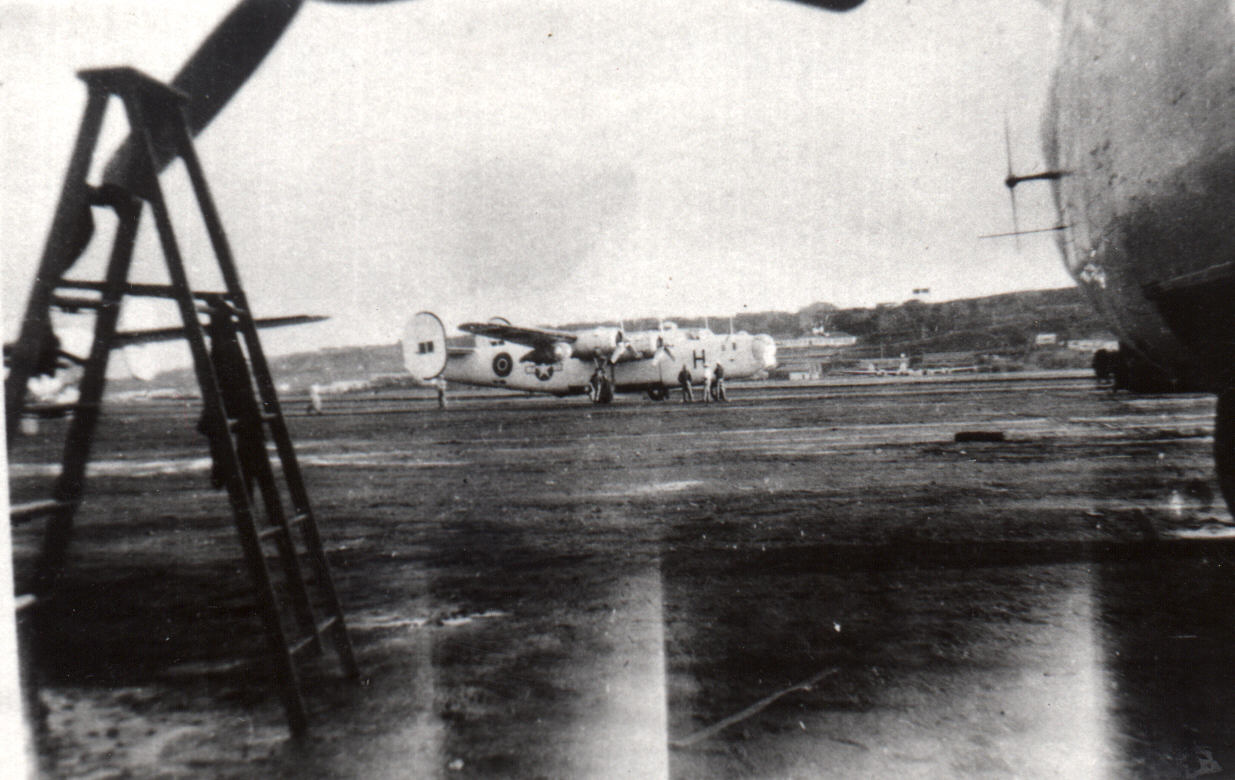
A PB4Y-1 Liberator on the completed Lajes Airfield using the dual British-American markings typical of the RAF Coastal Command partnership

With the outbreak of the Second World War, the Portuguese Navy finally established a permanent Air-Navy Centre in Ponta Delgada. At the same time, a military aerodrome was established at Santana, in the civil parish of Rabo de Peixe, in the municipality of Ribeira Grande. Located on the northern part of the island, it operated as a military installation during the War, when it was known as Base Aérea No.4. But, by the spring of 1941, António de Oliveira Salazar began to believe that Germany, or its allies, would completely overrun the Iberian Peninsula. As a consequence, the Estado Novo regime pondered the withdrawal of the Portuguese government to the Azores, with the support of Britain. It was in this context that an Anglo-Portuguese working group was established to study and design the construction of new airfields in the archipelago. But even as the fear subsided, British prime minister Winston Churchill believed that new installations would be essential in the control of central and southern supply routes in the Atlantic Ocean, as well as supporting Allied forces operating in North Africa and the Mediterranean Sea. The construction of air-sea bases would close the Azores Gap, and provide a secure blanket for the North Atlantic. The sudden attack at Pearl Harbor by Imperial Japanese forces resulted in a review of Portuguese guidelines, paralysing the working group.

A ship (the Portuguese Mirandela) shipped 30 Gloster SS37 Gladiators and five Junkers Ju 52 monoplanes, as well as support equipment and personnel, were sent to the Azores (departing on 4 June 1941). Fifteen of the Gloster Gladiators and five Ju 52s were deposited in São Miguel at Air Base 4, for the 1st Expeditionary Fighter Squadron, while the remaining planes were sent to Terceira to form the 2nd Expeditionary Fighter Squadron. At the same time, the British sent to São Miguel 12 Curtiss P-36 Hawk, to constitute the 3rd Expeditionary Fighter Squadron.

But, the Achada Airfield in Terceira suffered from periods of fog, which covered the area during most of the year. This meteorological problem, forced the relocation of air operations to the plain of Lajes, where they constructed a new runway.

After long negotiations, an agreement was established between Portugal and Great Britain (1 August 1943), which conceded the facilities at Air Base 4 and Lajes for use by British forces to base their North Atlantic anti-submarine patrols. In exchange, the Portuguese received six squadrons of Hawker Hurricanes. By this time, in 1942, Humberto Delgado was appointed Air Force representative to the Anglo-Portuguese working group. Conscious of the geostrategic importance of the Azores to trans-Atlantic flight, Delgado recommended to Salazar that one of the two air bases (Santa Maria or Lajes) should be converted into a trans-Atlantic airport and centre for air traffic control, while noting: "If Your Excellency wishes to decide [which airport], I would say Lajes will do, but everyone, even the British, consider Santa Maria better". For his efficiency in the commission, the British government, decorated Humberto Delgado with the Order of the British Empire, since the officer had risked his career and future on the Allied cause. Between 15–18 May 1943, the Trident conference to approve an Allied strategy on the Azores. It was followed by the Quebec Conference between August 11 and 30, in which U.S. President Franklin D. Roosevelt and the British Prime Minister agreed that Great Britain would enter the Azores with Portuguese authorization, followed by the United States, two weeks later. On 10 September, a combined British force, under the command of Air Marshall G.R. Bromet, departed from Liverpool in the direction of the island of Terceira.

British forces disembarked on 8 October 1943, at the Port of Pipas, in Angra do Heroísmo, and a contingent of 3000 soldiers travelled to Lajes in begin expanding the small aerodrome in the area called Terra Chã. Before the end of the year, the 235 Squadron of the Royal Air Force's Coastal Command was able to sink a German submarine using its contingent on Terceira. By the beginning of 1944, 1400 U.S. troops and 1700 tonnes of equipment had also arrived in Angra and Praia da Vitória, in order to expand and reinforce the runway at Lajes. This included the 928 Engineering Regiment of the U.S. Air Force (17 January), and the 95 Battalion of the U.S. Navy's Seabee construction corp (19 January). Later the US authorities signed an agreement to construct an aerodrome on the island of Santa Maria (28 November 1944). This was done under the guidance of Pan American airlines, as the Portuguese, not wanting to arouse the wrath of Nazi Germany, only accepted the project on the grounds that it was a civilian facility. The construction began in 1944, in conjunction with the erection of a company hospital that served to provide medical assistance to U.S. troops hurt in the European theatre of operations.

At the end of 1946, the aerodrome in Santana was converted into a civil airport, with two grass fields (one with a 1500-metre runway and the other 100 metres in length). The local population, owing to its rural location, on prime agricultural location, resulted in its local colloquial name as aerovacas, since cattle grazed on the land when flights were not occurring. Ponta Delgada-Santana field was a regional airport at the time, and international services were directed to the international airports in Santa Maria or Lajes Airfield.

=== Post-World Wars ===
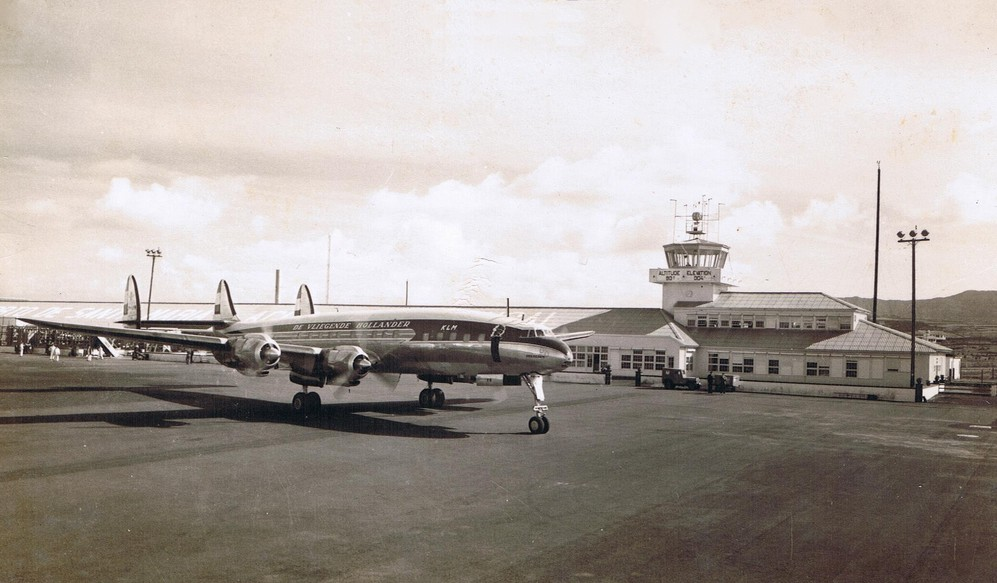
A KLM L-1049C Constellation at Santa Maria, during the post-World War era Santa Maria was the hub of International travel for the Azores

But, the inauguration of the Ponta Delgada-Nordela Airport on the southern coast of São Miguel island, fronting the main population centre, on 10 August 1969, changed the face of regional/international services in the Azores. Since its inauguration the Nordela Airport served as the operational base of SATA Air Azores and, two years later (in 1971), TAP Air Portugal began to provide regular flights between Lisbon and Ponta Delgada.

By the start of 1970s, 2 more aerodromes were constructed on other islands in the archipelago:

- on 24 August 1971, a new airport in the civil parish of Castelo Branco along the southern coast of Faial was inaugurated; and
- in 1972, Flores Airport was constructed on the eastern coast of the island of Airport to support the neighbouring islands of Flores and Corvo.

In 1976, following the fall of the Estado Novo regime, in an era that was tumultuous, the democratic politicians debated a proposal in Portuguese National Assembly to regionalize the provision of services to the Azores and Madeira.

Following these events, the increasingly autonomous governments of the Azores, between 1981 and 1983, built several airports to provide expanded service to the remaining islands. In addition to improvements at Horta Airport, the government of the Azores finalized construction of:

- Graciosa Airport;
- Pico Airport;
- São Jorge Airport;
- Corvo Airport.

== SATA ==
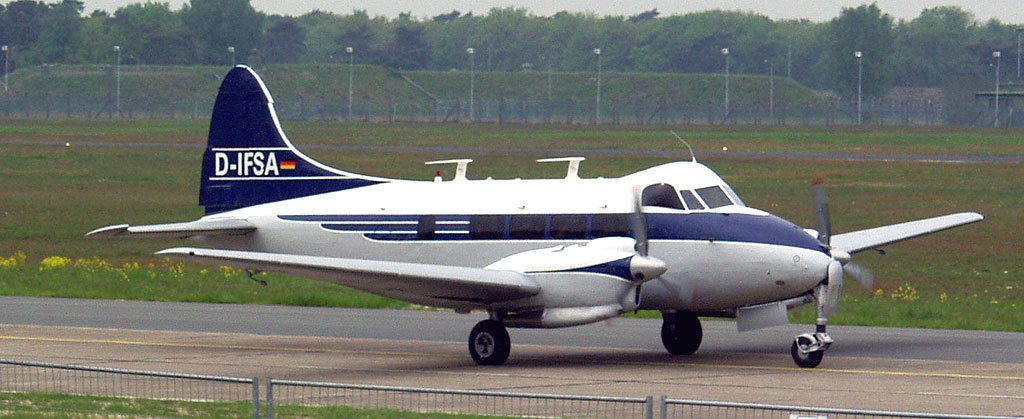
A De Havilland DH-104 Dove, used by Sociedade Açoriana de Transportes Aéreos, Lda., the forerunner of SATA Air Azores

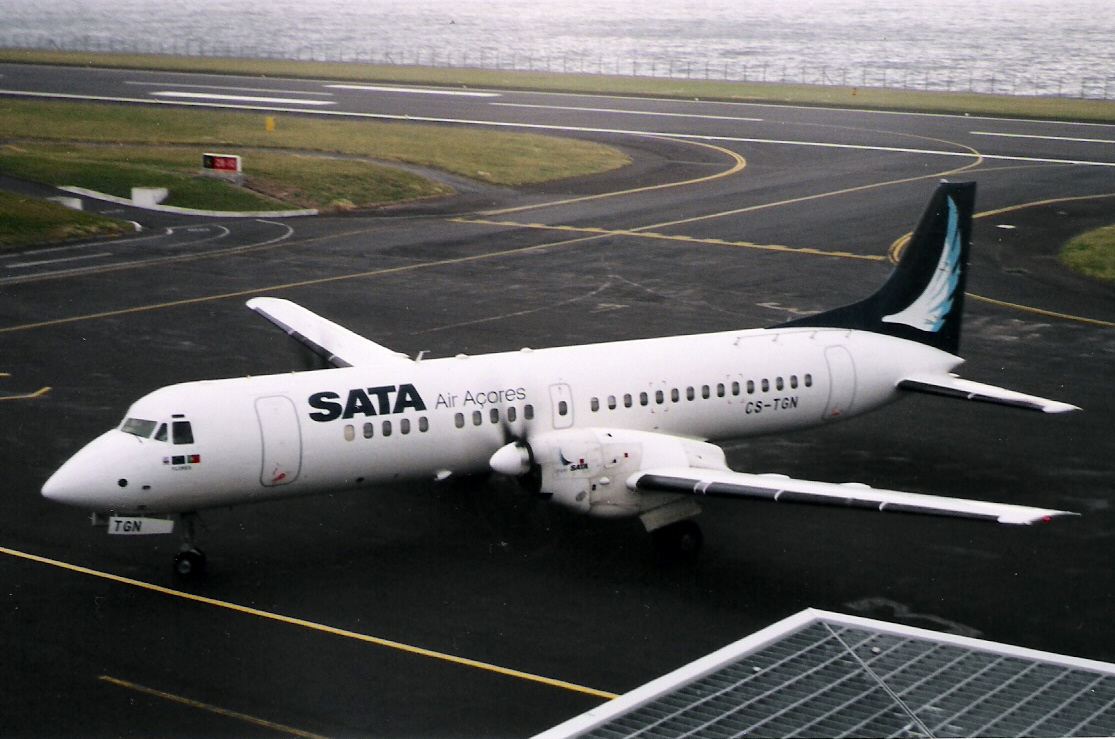
A SATA ATP at Horta Airport (c.1990); a fleet of ATPs were acquired to replace the HS748s during the 1980–1990 era

Since the 1940s, the Portuguese flag carrier Transportes Aéreos Portugueses (today's TAP Portugal) operated regular flights to the Azores through the gateways in Ponta Delgada, Lajes and Vila do Porto. Meanwhile, a group of investors started their own air carrier: Sociedade Açoriana de Transportes Aéreos, or SATA, as it was known, during the Second World War. These investors, which included Augusto Rebelo Arruda, founded the Sociedade Açoriana de Estudos Aéreos, Limitada (on 21 August 1941), with the objective of obtaining the authorization from the Portuguese government to establish flights between the islands and mainland Portugal.

Six years later, its objective reached, the company changed its name to Sociedade Açoriana de Transportes Aéreos, Limitada, and on 15 June 1947 inaugurated flights using their first Beechcraft (serial number CS-TAA), named Açor. The airplane transported two crew and seven passengers, and made connections between the islands of São Miguel (from the Santana air field until 1969, and later from Nordela after 1969) with Santa Maria and Terceira. A year later, SATA received two De Havilland DH.104 Dove (on 23 May 1948), with a capacity for nine passengers and 700 kilos of cargo (in addition to the crew). Flight operations began on the 1 August 1948, but were quickly suspended after the Beechcraft was involved in an accident. On the morning of 5 August, the Açor crew registered difficulties after departing São Miguel on a routine flight to Santa Maria.

On 21 August 1963, the SATA fleet increase with the acquisition of a Douglas DC-3 with a capacity for 26 passengers. In 1972, SATA acquired the small fleet of Avro HS-748 which it had been using since 1969, with an improved capacity for 48 passengers.

Following the Carnation Revolution, in 1976, when the Portuguese government debated regionalization of aviation services, the Portuguese Air Force transferred two Douglas DC-6 to SATA. Regionalization was achieved on 17 October 1980, when 50% of SATA's operating shares were purchased from the Bensaude Group by the Regional Government of the Azores (the remainder by TAP Air Portugal, EP). The purchase allowed the regionalization of air services into the public company "Serviço Açoriano de Transportes Aéreos, Empresa Pública" (while maintaining its abbreviation). The same year that SATA became a public company, it also joined the European Regional Airline Association (ERAA) and the International Air Transport Association (IATA).

Following the suggestion of Regional President Mota Amaral, in 1986, the regional air carrier began to operate as "SATA Air Açores". After 1985, Azores Express, a company of Grupo SATA, operated charter flights between the United States and the archipelago, while SATA Express, served charter services to Canada.

By the end of the 1980s, SATA re-marketed itself: in 1988, it altered its colours; began re-publishing its onboard magazine Paralelo 38 as the bilingual Espírito Açoriano/Azorean Spirit; and between 1989 and 1990, the Avro aircraft were replaced by a small fleet of British Aerospace ATP aircraft. The first aircraft, baptized Santa Maria entered into service in 1989; the second, named Flores, in 1990; and the third, Graciosa, in 1991. Still in 1991, the first permanent flights began to serve the island of Corvo, with a single Dornier 228-212, occasionally substituted by a CASA C-212 Aviocar from the Portuguese Air Force.

The SATA Group expanded internationally through the acquisition of OceanAir (which had suspended flying in 1994), and on 20 February 1998 renamed it SATA International, re-inaugurating services on 8 April 1998. While SATA Air Açores continued to operate within the archipelago, the new entity provided connections internationally and to the European continent with a fleet of Airbus Industries aircraft (including A310 for long-haul and A320 for domestic/short-haul service).

In October 2015, SATA Internacional announced a major rebranding including a name change to "Azores Airlines" and a renewal of the fleet.

== See also ==
- North Atlantic Tracks
