= SATA Air Açores =

Portuguese airline

Coordinates: 37°44′28″N 25°41′53″W

IATA	ICAO	Call sign
SP	SAT	SATA
- Founded: August 21, 1941
- Commenced operations: June 15, 1947
- Operating bases: João Paulo II Airport
- Focus cities: Lajes Airport; Horta Airport
- Frequent-flyer program: SATA Imagine
- Subsidiaries: Azores Airlines
- Fleet size: 7
- Destinations: 13
- Parent company: Grupo SATA
- Headquarters: Ponta Delgada, São Miguel
- Key people: Teresa Gonçalves (CEO)
- Website: azoresairlines.pt

SATA Air Açores is a Portuguese airline based in São Sebastião, Ponta Delgado in the Azores, Portugal. It operates scheduled passenger, cargo and mail services mainly around the Azores but also Madeira and Canary islands. It provides its own maintenance and handling services and manages four regional airports. Its main base is at João Paulo II Airport, Ponta Delgada. It also maintains a subsidiary for mid- and long-haul flights, Azores Airlines, the former SATA International.

== History ==
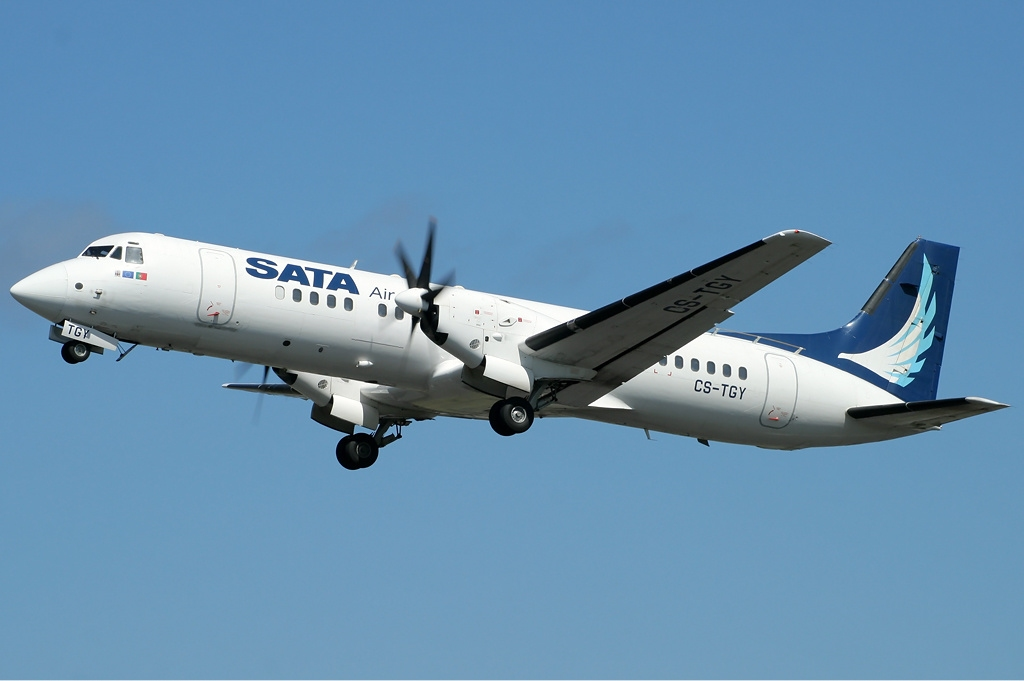
A now retired SATA Air Açores British Aerospace ATP

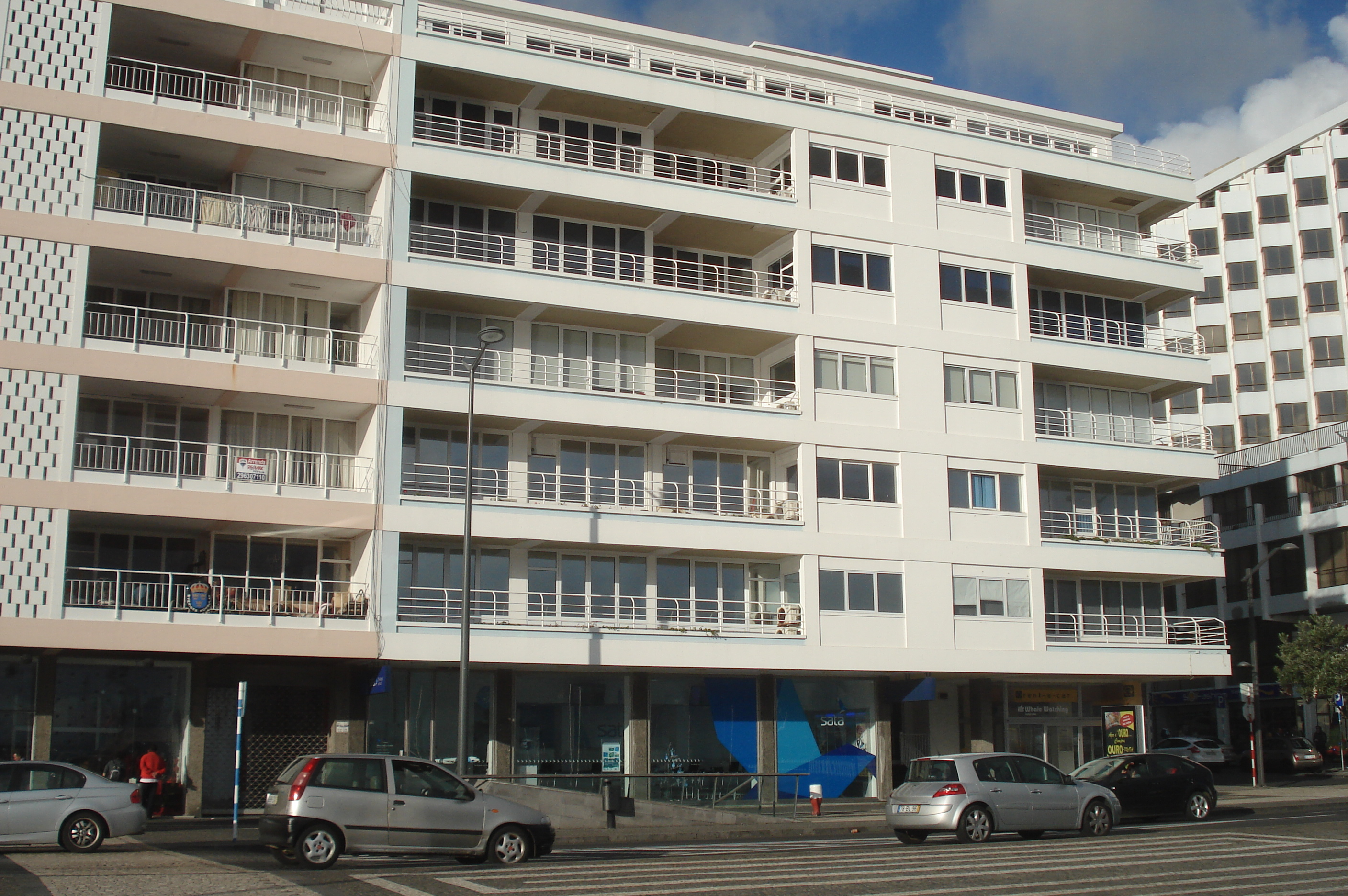
SATA headquarters in Ponta Delgada

On August 21, 1941, a group of investors that included Augusto Rebelo Arruda, José Bensaude, Augusto d'Athayde, Corte Real Soares de Albergaria, Albano de Freitas da Silva and the company Bensaude & Co. Lda. (through its managing director António de Medeiros e Almeida) established Sociedade Açoreana de Estudos Aéreos Lda. (English: Azorean Aviation Studies Company, Ltd.) to look into the feasibility of developing an inter-island airline that would link the Azorean archipelago and continental Portugal, and to obtain the government concession to do so. Augusto Rebelo Arruda eventually transferred his shares to Bensaude & Co. Lda. on September 15, 1947, although the first Sociedade Açoreana de Transportes Aéreos (English: Azorean Air Transport Company) flight occurred from Santa Maria Airport in June 1947. Captain Marciano Veiga piloted the first flight at the controls of a twin-engine Beechcraft (named Açor) with seven passengers.

The Portuguese government granted a temporary concession to the airline, which operated mail, cargo and air passenger services between São Miguel (Santana Field, until 1969), Terceira (at Achada, Lajes) and Santa Maria airports. By May 23, 1948, the airline had received two de Havilland DH.104 Dove aircraft to supplement its operations. On August 5, 1948, one of these Beechcraft failed to take to the air and crashed on take-off: all the passengers and crew were killed, prompting the suspension of flight operations. Two new DH.104 Doves would be delivered on May 23, 1949, with the capacity for nine passengers, and a Douglas DC-3 Dakota (CS-TAD) with capacity for 26 passengers would enter into by July 1, 1964.

In 1969, Nordela Airport (which would eventually be rechristened João Paulo II International) in Ponta Delgada (Relva) was inaugurated to civil traffic and would become the SATA base of operations. By 1971, TAP Air Portugal would begin Lisbon-Ponta Delgada service, and the airport in Horta, Faial would be inaugurated on August 24, 1971. The airline would eventually replace its aging fleet with Hawker Siddeley HS 748 turboprops (1972) with a larger capacity and range, that would fly between the newer airports constructed in all nine islands of the archipelago (between 1981 and 1983). In 1976, the Portuguese Air Force offered two Douglas DC-6 airplanes with a continental range. They were to be used effectively during a TAP strike that allowed SATA to extend their services to Lisbon. By April 14, 1977, it would have transported 1 million passengers throughout the regional market.

It was originally formed as a private company (50% interest held by Bensaude & Co.Lda.), but on 17 October 1980, it was reborn as a state-owned enterprise (SOE) operated by the Regional Government and TAP Air Portugal. It became a signatory of the European Regions Airline Association (ERA) and the International Air Transport Association (IATA) charters in 1980 when it became an SOE, which it remains as of March 2014. The name of the airline changed in 1980 to SATA Air Açores.

Between 1989 and 1990, the inter-island HS 748 aircraft were gradually replaced by BAe ATP, after the first aircraft (named Santa Maria) entered service in 1989. Eventually, other planes would be added, reflecting the regional politics, each aircraft would be named after an island (Flores, in 1990, and Graciosa, in 1991), including a small Dornier 228-212 that was added to link the small island of Corvo, which substituted a CASA C-212 Aviocar Series 100 operated by the Portuguese Air Force. A revitalization program was initiated in the late part of the 2000s to rationalize and upgrade existing aircraft, resulting in a competition between ATR and Bombardier to supply the necessary equipment that met the needs of the archipelago. The decision to purchase Bombardier NextGen aircraft was not without controversy. The latest phase of its fleet renovation, which complies with a 15–20 year plan, began in July 2009, with the entry into service of two Bombardier Q200. It was followed up with a ceremony in Toronto, Ontario, on 25 January 2010, when the first next-generation Bombardier Q400, registration CS-TRD, was unveiled. The first of a series (four in all) began arriving at the end of January 2010; the second, registration CS-TRE, was received on 11 February, and the remaining planes arrived in March (registered CS-TRF and CS-TRG). The Q400 aircraft were projected for the short distance, high-density markets with the archipelago and Macaronesian destinations. Its two PW150A engines, allows the planes to cruise at 667 kilometres per hour (360 kn; 414 mph), while transporting 80 passengers comfortably for distances up to 2,500 kilometres (1,600 mi), markedly within the limits of the archipelago.

== Livery ==
SATA introduced a new logo with the new fleet revitalization; referred to as Blue Island Açor, it was inaugurated with the appearance of the first Bombardier aircraft, the Q200. Based on a year-long effort, and over 100 drafts, the re-imagined modern Açor brand was designed by Ivity-Corp. It is basically a geometric composite of nine-shapes, representing the nine islands of the archipelago, joined to form the ubiquitous Açor identified in the legend. When exploded, each shape can be placed alone in geographical context to form a modernist map of the Azores.

== Fleet ==
=== Current fleet ===
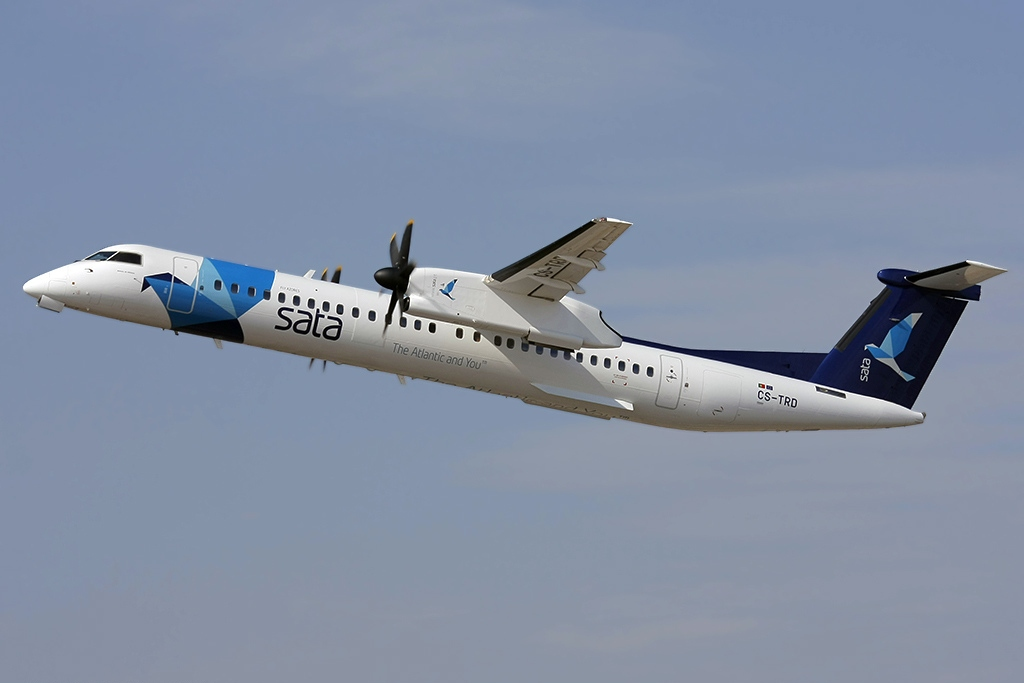
SATA Air Açores Bombardier Dash 8 Q400

As of August 2025, SATA Air Açores operates the following aircraft:

SATA Air Açores fleet
Aircraft	In service	Orders	Passengers	Notes
Bombardier Dash 8-Q200	2	—	37	
Bombardier Dash 8-Q400	5	—	80	
Total	7	—		

=== Historic fleet ===
SATA Air Açores previously also operated the following aircraft types:

- BAe ATP
- British Aerospace 146
- Douglas DC-3
- Douglas DC-6
- Dornier 228
- Hawker Siddeley HS 748
- de Havilland DH.104 Dove

== Incidents and accidents ==
- On 11 December 1999, SATA Air Açores Flight 530M crashed on the island of São Jorge in the Azores. The British Aerospace ATP, en route from Ponta Delgada Airport to Horta Airport, was on descent in heavy rain and turbulence. The combination of the weather conditions, the pilots not using the onboard weather radar, imprecise navigation, and the plane not keeping above the minimum safe altitude, the plane crashed into the north face of Pico da Esperança. All 35 people on board were killed.

== See also ==
- Aviation in the Azores
