= Azores Airlines =

Portuguese airline

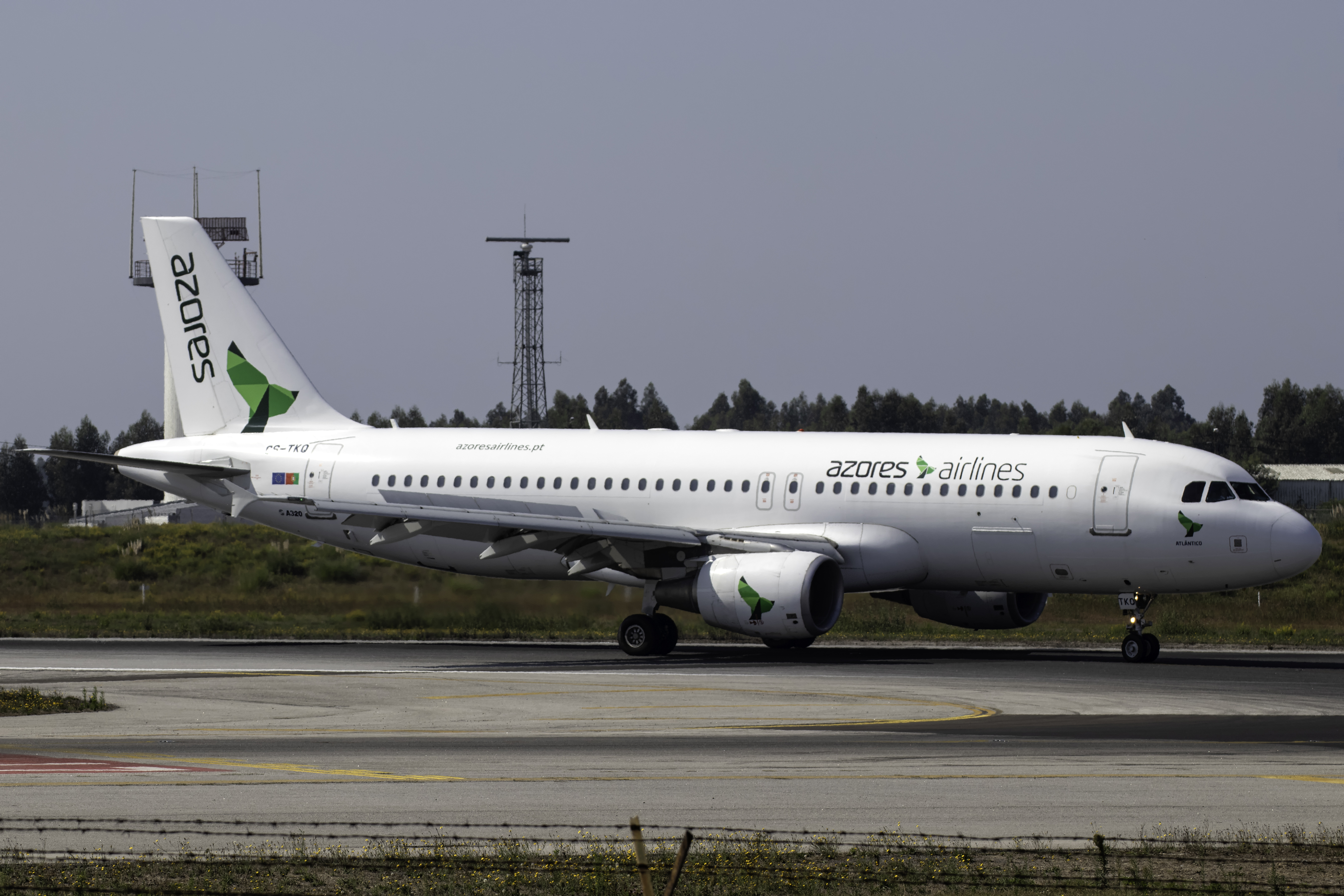
IATA	ICAO	Call sign
S4	RZO	AIR AZORES
- Founded: 1990 (as OceanAir); 1998 (as SATA Internacional); 2015 (as Azores Airlines)
- Commenced operations: 1998
- Operating bases: João Paulo II Airport; Humberto Delgado Airport
- Focus cities: Lisbon Airport
- Frequent-flyer program: SATA Imagine
- Fleet size: 9
- Destinations: 20
- Parent company: SATA Air Açores
- Headquarters: Ponta Delgada, São Miguel, Azores, Portugal
- Key people: Teresa Gonçalves (CEO)
- Website: www.azoresairlines.pt

Azores Airlines, previously known as SATA Internacional, is a Portuguese airline based in the municipality of Ponta Delgada, on the island of São Miguel in the autonomous archipelago of the Azores.

== History ==
=== Early years ===
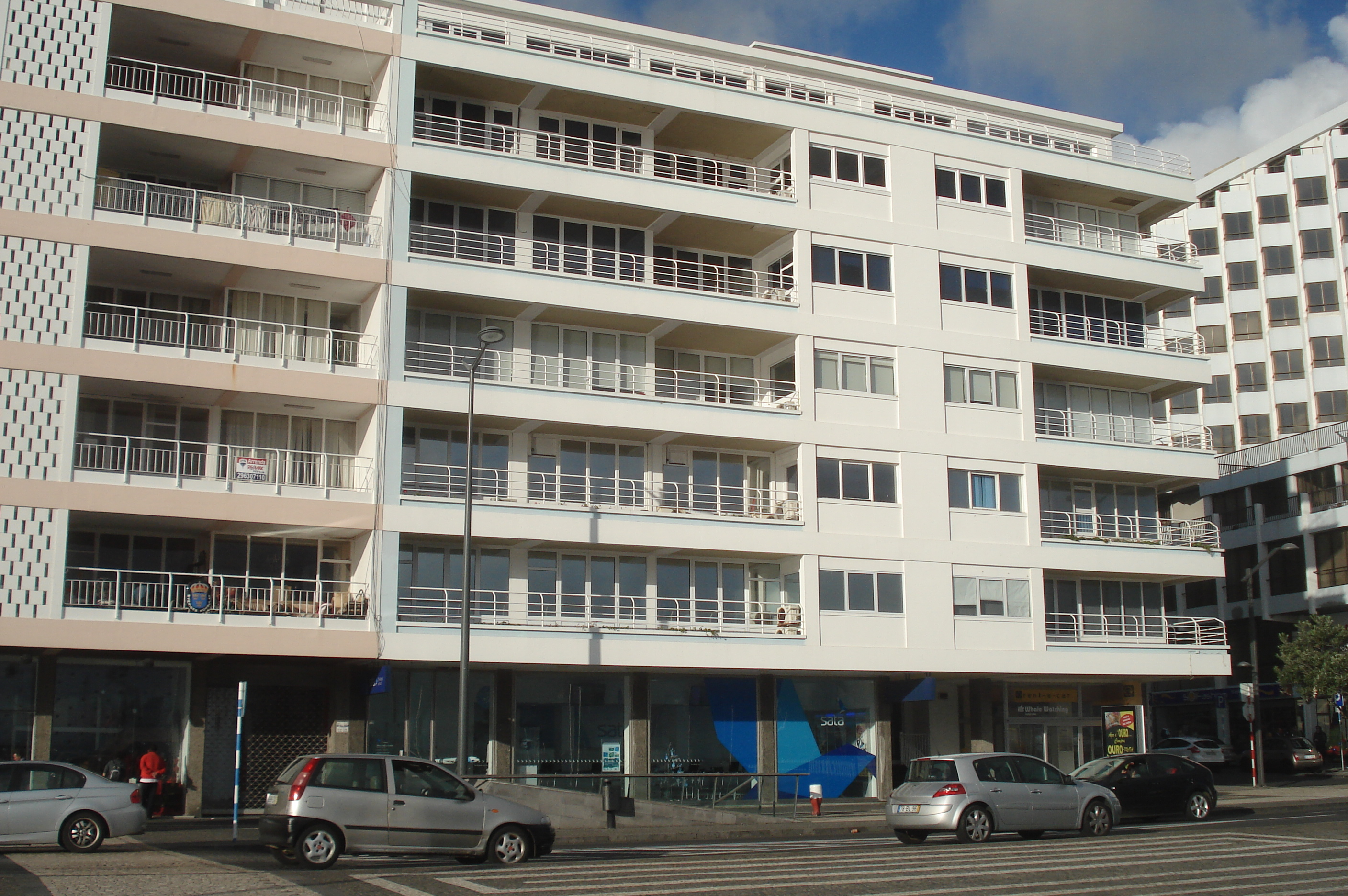
The SATA Group headquarters in Ponta Delgada

The airline was first established in March 1990 under the name of OceanAir and in 1995 was authorized to operate air transport services as a non-scheduled carrier. SATA Air Açores became the major shareholder when OceanAir suspended service in 1994. It later became the sole owner, and on 20 February 1998, it was re-branded as SATA Internacional, resuming operations on 8 April 1998. The airline became a wholly owned subsidiary of Grupo SATA, which also operates SATA Air Açores.

Following its bid by public tender, SATA Internacional was awarded scheduled routes from Ponta Delgada to Lisbon, Madeira Island and Porto. SATA would later own two tour operators in North America: SATA Express in Canada and Azores Express in the United States.

=== 21st century ===
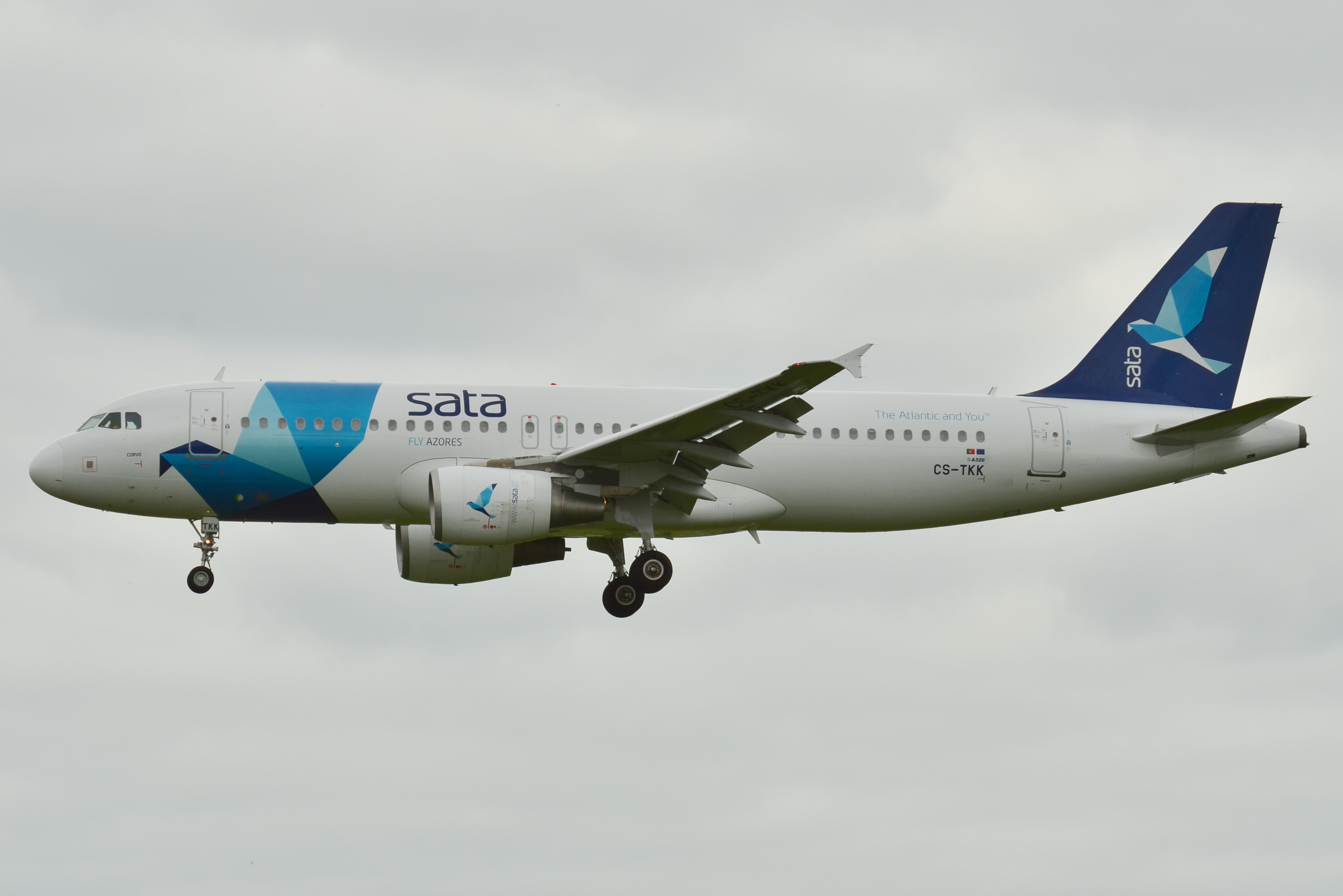
Azores Airlines Airbus A320-200 in former SATA Internacional livery

In May 2009, SATA adopted a new brand image and a new logo which was applied to its first new Airbus A320-200, registered CS-TKO and named "Diáspora". The new scheme was adopted by both SATA Internacional and SATA Air Açores during the fleet upgrades beginning at the end of the 1990s and lasted until 2015.

In January 2015, the airline announced strategic plans to reduce its debts from €179 million to €40 million by 2020 by reducing its fleet and workforce. Under the plan it would also be renamed Azores Airlines. In October 2015, SATA Internacional subsequently announced a major rebranding, including the name change to Azores Airlines and a change of the colour scheme from blue tones to green tones. At the same time, a fleet renewal with Airbus A330 aircraft had been announced. The first A330 commercial flight took place on 25 March 2016 from Ponta Delgada to Boston.

In September 2016, the airline announced a change of plans regarding its fleet renewal. While plans to phase in a second Airbus A330 were later cancelled, Azores Airlines ordered two Airbus A321neo aircraft on interim lease for 2017-2019 and four Airbus A321LR aircraft to be delivered in 2019 to replace the interim A321neo aircraft. The A310 fleet was fully retired in October 2018, after which the airline's fleet was composed entirely of narrowbody Airbus aircraft. In July 2019, the airline received its first Airbus A321LR. However, by the end of 2019 when the airline had been expected to return the A321neo aircraft, it had retained them instead.

In January 2021, an Airbus A321LR operating Azores Airlines Flight S46865 claimed the record for the longest commercial A321LR flight by duration, which operated as a charter from Lisbon to Bogotá in a time of 9 hours and 49 minutes. The airline surpassed the record previously set by Air Transat for its A321LR flight on 26 October 2020 from Montréal Trudeau to Athens, taking a duration of 8 hours and 20 minutes, but was later surpassed by TAP Air Portugal on 29 March 2021 with its A321LR flight from Maputo to Praia, for a flight duration of 10 hours and 7 minutes.

== Destinations ==
Azores Airlines operates scheduled domestic flights from the Azores to the Madeira Islands and mainland Portugal, and international flights from the Azores to destinations in Africa, Europe and North America, as well as charter flights. Regional flights within the Azores are operated by its parent company, SATA Air Açores.

=== Interline agreements ===
Azores Airlines has interlining agreements with the following airlines:

- Alaska Airlines
- APG Airlines
- Hahn Air
- Cabo Verde Airlines
- JetBlue
- Porter Airlines
- SATA Air Açores

=== Codeshare agreements ===
Azores Airlines has codeshare agreements with the following airlines:

- Air France
- TAP Air Portugal
- WestJet

== Fleet ==
=== Current fleet ===
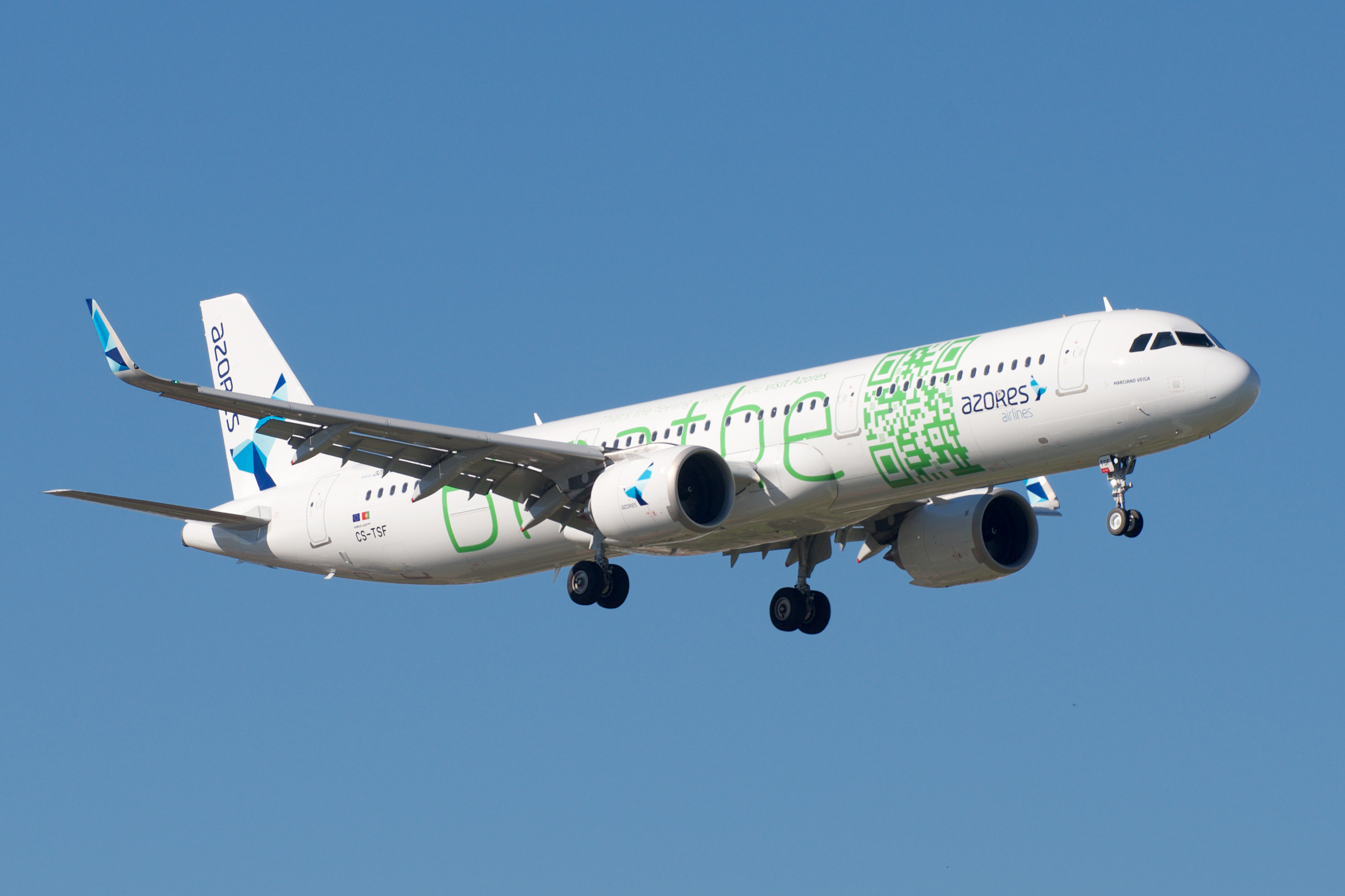
Azores Airlines Airbus A321neo

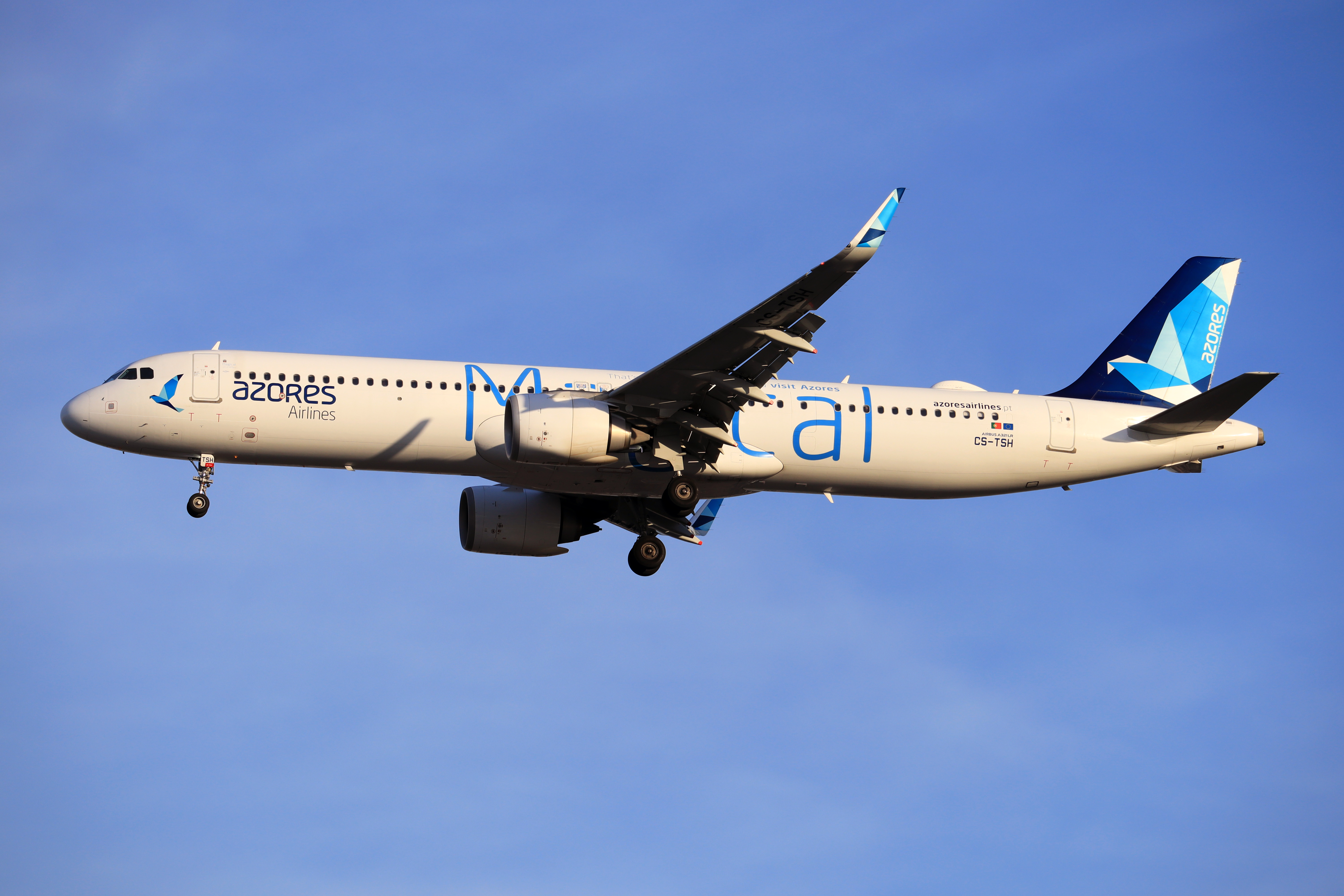
Azores Airlines Airbus A321LR

As of August 2025, Azores Airlines operates an all-Airbus A320 family fleet composed of the following aircraft:

Azores Airlines fleet
Aircraft	In service	Orders	Passengers			Notes
Aircraft	In service	Orders	J	Y	Total	Notes
Airbus A320-200	3	—	—	168	168	1 (CS-TSY) Leased from White Airways
Airbus A320neo	2	—	—	168	168	
Airbus A321LR	3	—	16	174	190	
Airbus A321neo	2	—	16	170	186	
Total	10	—				

Smaller aircraft are operated by parent SATA Air Açores under its own air operator's certificate, while longer-range aircraft operating flights for Azores Airlines may be seasonally wet-leased.

== Liveries ==
The airline over its history as SATA Internacional and later as Azores Airlines has iterated various liveries.

=== SATA Internacional liveries ===
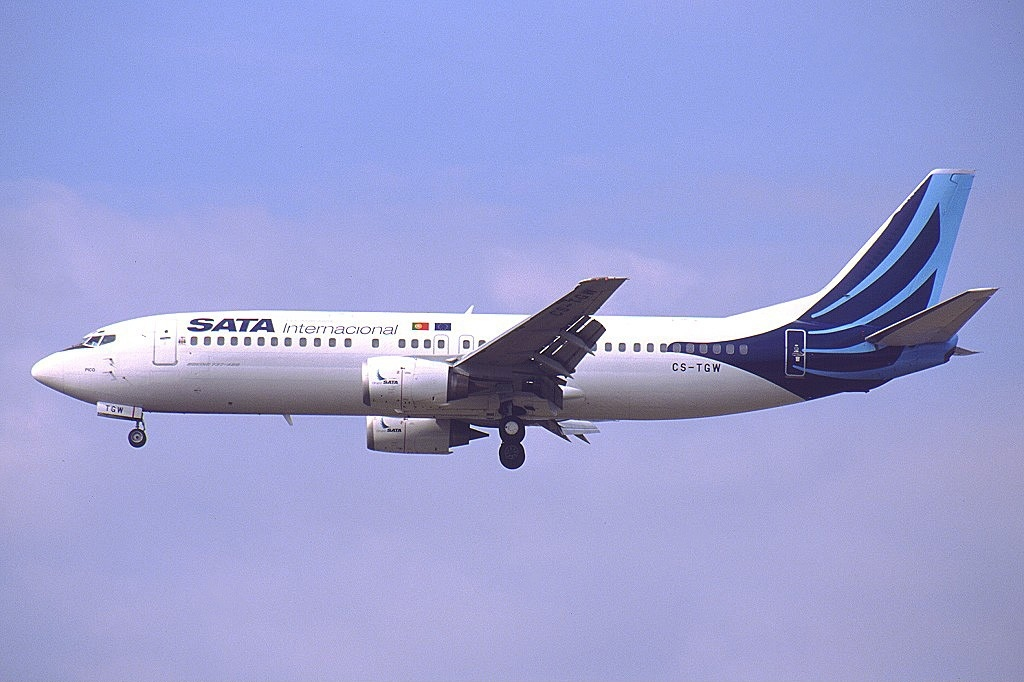
A former SATA Internacional Boeing 737-400 in the airline's second livery

The airline's original livery consisted of an all white fuselage with the name SATA Internacional in ocean blue over the front windows, and a dark blue tail with the company logo. Before this, the livery had an idealised logo featuring the bands of crashing waves, superimposed by a sun-disk, with the calligraphic lettering "Fly Azores" below. This tourist-friendly logo was retired at the end of the 20th century, to be replaced with a more corporate image.

The airline as well as its parent company SATA Air Açores adopted new branding in 2009, which included an idealised bird symbol as the new logo. The symbol, called BIA (for "Blue Islands Açor"), consisted of nine geometrical shapes, representing the nine islands of the Azores assembled to form the mythical Açor of Portuguese legend. The "açor" or northern goshawk was thought to have been the bird found circling the islands of the Azores when Portuguese sailors first discovered the archipelago. This form appeared on the tail fin, in addition to a portion located just ahead of the wings on the fuselage.

=== Azores Airlines liveries ===
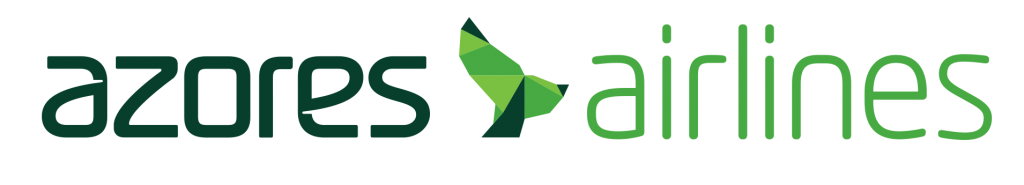
Initial 2015 logo of Azores Airlines, featuring green tones and a symbol resembling a whale's tail

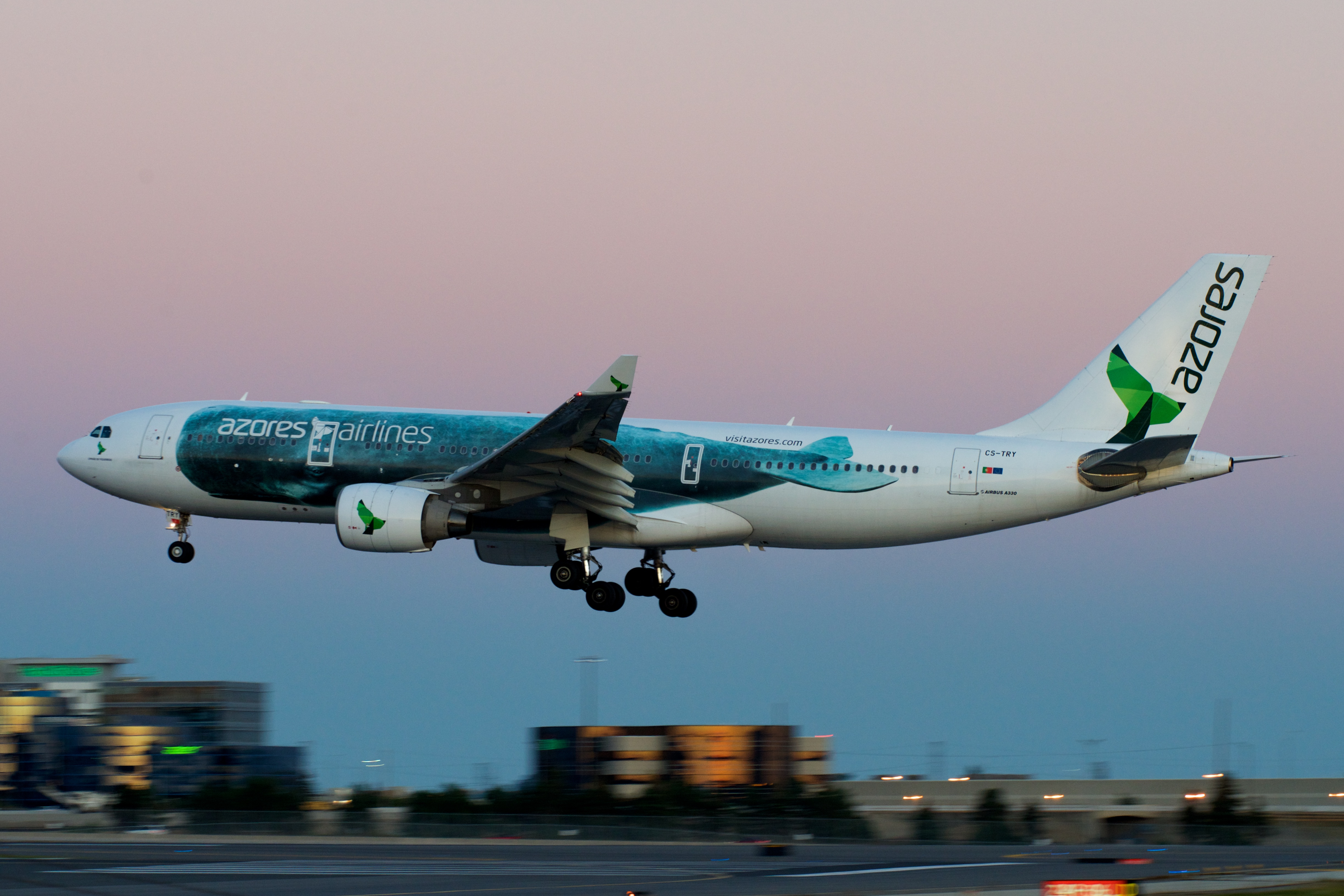
A former Azores Airlines Airbus A330-200, featuring elements of the initial 2015 branding

Following the airline's rebranding in 2015 from SATA Internacional to Azores Airlines, the new branding consisted of a change from blue tones to green tones, and the airline's previous açor symbol was changed to a symbol resembling a whale's tail exposed above the ocean surface, though like the previous symbol was also of nine geometrical shapes. The main elements of the new branding on the airline's livery consisted of the word "Azores" written on the aircraft tailfin, the whale tail symbol appearing on the tailfin, engines, and within the airline's name written on the forward fuselage. The airline's first Airbus A330-200 additionally featured a decal of a sperm whale on the main fuselage, with the whale tail symbol and logo also appearing on the wingtips.

In 2017, the airline introduced revisions to its branding and livery upon the delivery of its first Airbus A321neo aircraft, which involved abandoning the green tones in the airline's wordmark and logo in favor of the blue tones originally adopted in 2009, but maintaining the use of the whale tail logo. The wingtips also featured blue geometrical shapes resembling the logo. On the airline's Airbus A321neo and A321LR aircraft, the fuselage prominently features a word, consisting of either "Breathe", "Wonder", "Magical", "Inspire" or "Peaceful" in a different colour, accompanied by the text, "That's the feeling when you visit Azores." in a matching colour. The airline's name, logo, and associated websites are also written on either side at the forward and rear boarding doors. The airline's A321neo and the first of two A321LR aircraft collectively delivered between 2017 and 2019 additionally feature a QR code leading to the airline's website.

In late 2020, the airline's second Airbus A321LR featured further revisions to the branding and livery, consisting of the removal of the QR code, and abandoning the use of the whale tail logo in favor of a modified version of the original açor logo adopted in 2009. On the fuselage, the revised version of the livery includes the airline's wordmark written behind the forward boarding door, while the logo is placed between the boarding door and the cockpit windows. On the aircraft tail fin, the açor logo is enlarged compared to previous iterations, with the word "Azores" written in white along the rear edge of the tail fin, while the rest of the tail fin is coloured in dark blue. The airline's Airbus A320 aircraft were repainted to match the branding, each one with the word "Natural", "Dream" and "Unique" written prominently on their respective fuselages.

== Accidents and incidents ==
- On 4 August 2009, a SATA Internacional Airbus A320-200 operating flight S4-129 from Lisbon to Ponta Delgada bounced off the runway then subsequently experienced a severe hard landing of 4.86g, causing damage to the landing gear. Nothing was written in the aircraft's technical maintenance log, both flight crew and maintenance staff were unable to interpret the hard landing report and despite the damage, the aircraft was not removed from service and flew back to Lisbon in customer service as well as flying an additional 6 sectors. SATA said in a statement that the hard landing/load reports are not a mandatory requirement for the aircraft type and drew attention to the amount of time Airbus took to confirm to them the interpretation of the load report. Both landing gear legs subsequently had to be replaced. In their final report the Portuguese accident investigation authority the Aviation Accidents Prevention and Investigation Department determined that the primary cause of the incident was the ground spoilers deploying in flight after the aircraft had bounced 12 ft off the runway. Contributing factors were the failure of the pilot to go-around after the bounce, the failure of the pilot to release the thrust levers before the first touchdown (which inhibited the ground spoilers deploying) and the pilot providing insufficient flare input.

== See also ==
- Aviation in the Azores
