= Lajes Airport =

Airport in the Azores

Lajes Airport Base Aérea das Lajes
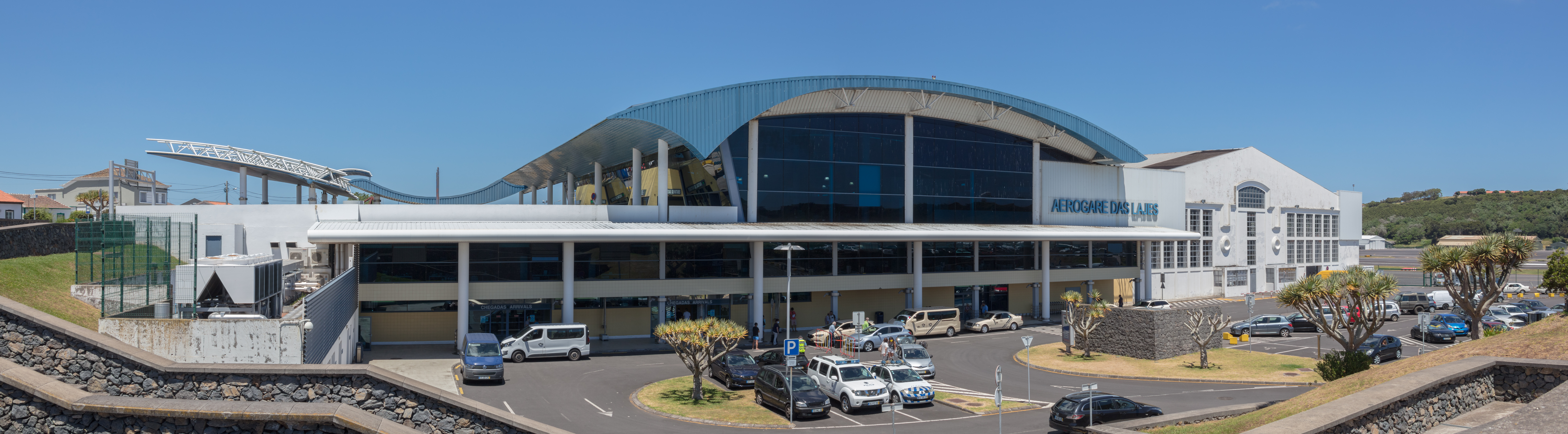
- IATA: TER; ICAO: LPLA

Summary
- Airport type: Civil
- Serves: Praia da Vitória/Angra do Heroísmo
- Location: Lajes
- Built: 1934
- Elevation AMSL: 55 m (180 ft)
- Coordinates: 38°45′43″N 027°05′27″W

Map
- Location of Lajes Field in the Azores

Runways
Direction	Length		Surface
Direction	m	ft	Surface
15/33	3,314	10,873	Asphalt

Statistics (2016)
- Passengers: 631,236
- Aircraft operations: 5,415
- Metric tonnes of cargo: 2,774
- Source: Portuguese AIP

Lajes Airport (IATA: TER, ICAO: LPLA) is located in the parish and Vila das Lajes, in the municipality of Praia da Vitória, on Terceira Island, in the Azores.

== Overview ==
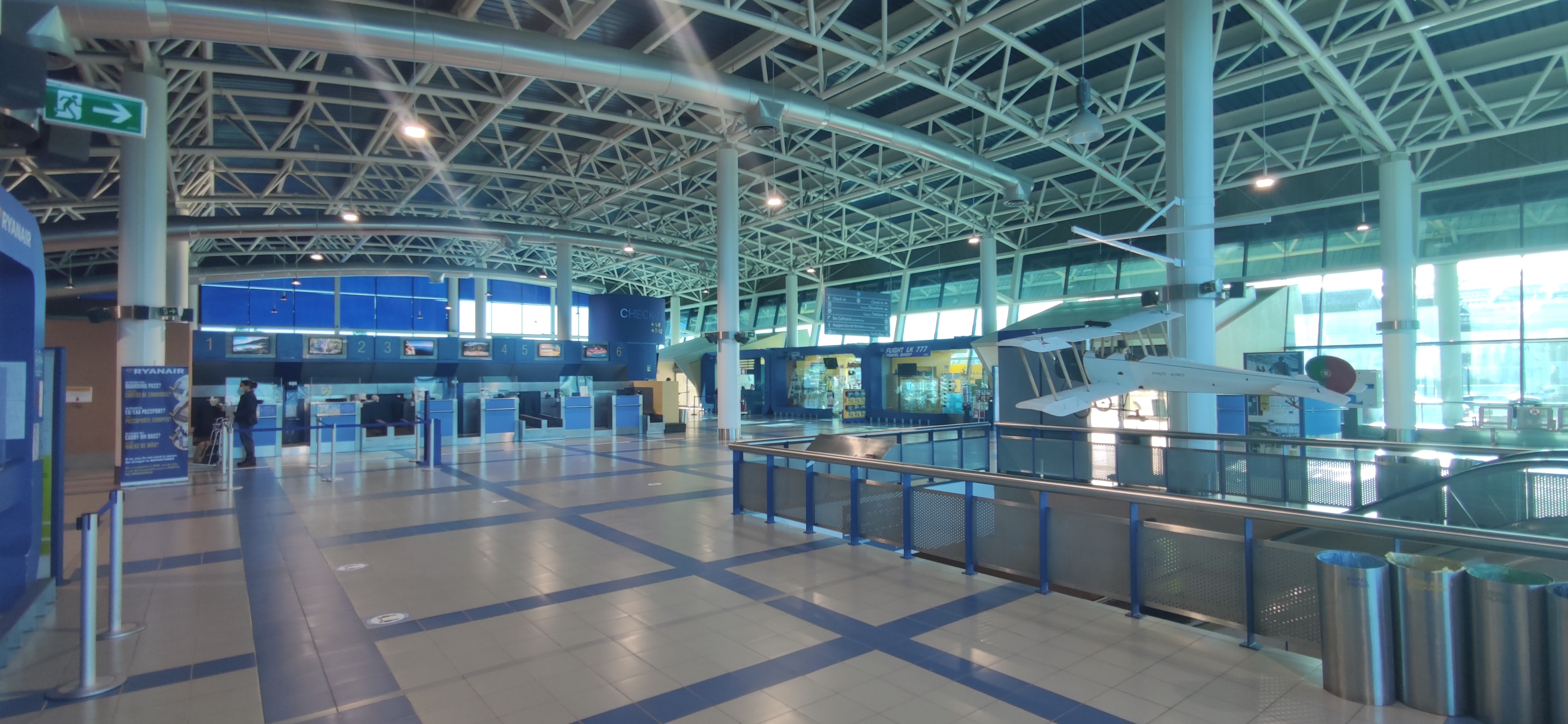
Check-in area

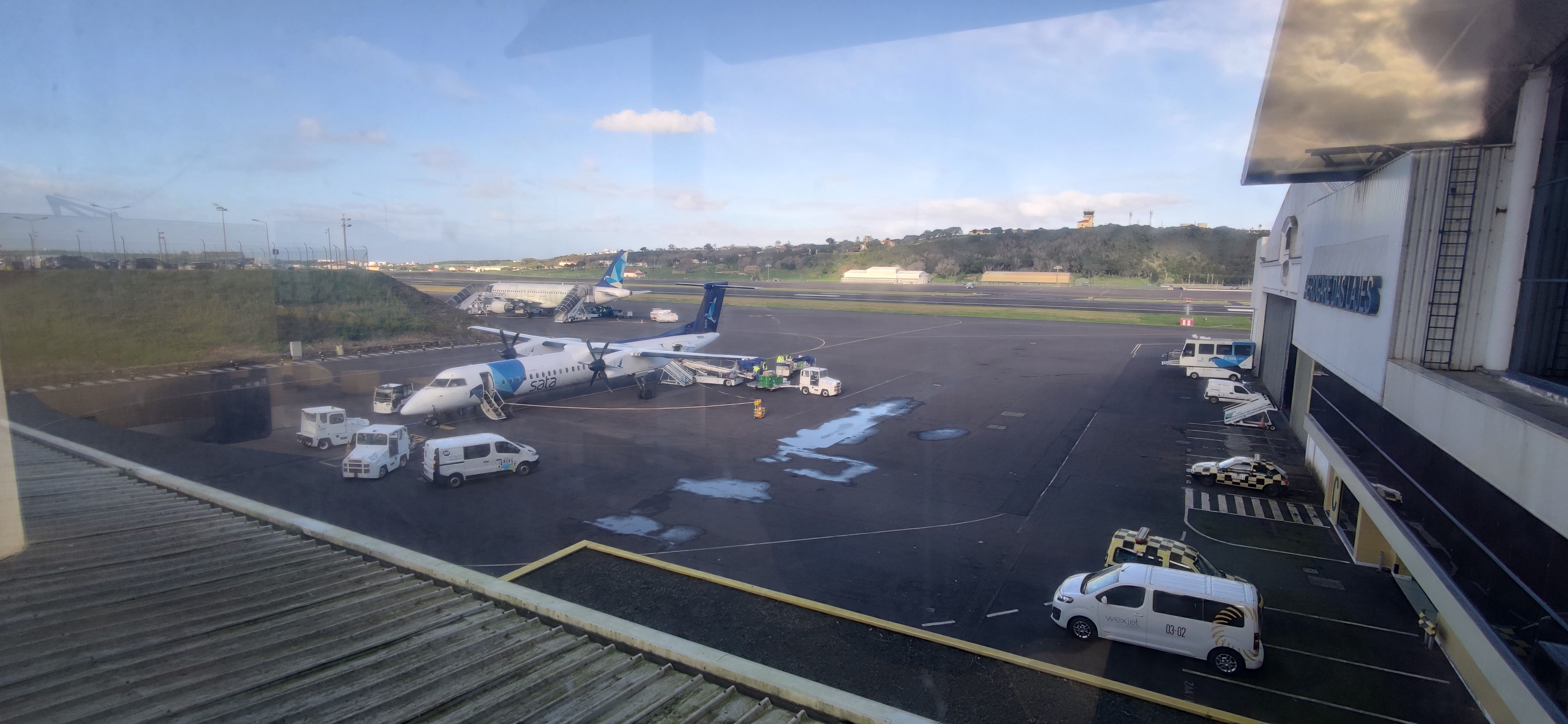
Apron view

Lajes Airport not only serves Terceira but is also a hub providing international access to the Azores. It shares a runway and control and support structures with the military Lajes Field. Its runway is the longest among the airports of the Azores, measuring about 3300 meters in length. Aerogare Civil das Lajes (ACL) has a capacity of 750,000 passengers per year and 360 passengers per hour as of the last requalification. It is the closest international airport in Europe measured from eastern United States, for example 3,969 kilometres (2,466 mi) from New York.

== Airlines and destinations ==
The following airlines operate regular scheduled and charter flights at Lajes Airport:

Airlines	Destinations
Azores Airlines	Boston, Funchal; Seasonal: Toronto–Pearson
Edelweiss Air	Seasonal: Zurich
TAP Air Portugal	Lisbon, Porto; Seasonal: San Francisco
United Airlines	Seasonal: Newark (begins 10 June 2027)
